= Coinage of Saxony =

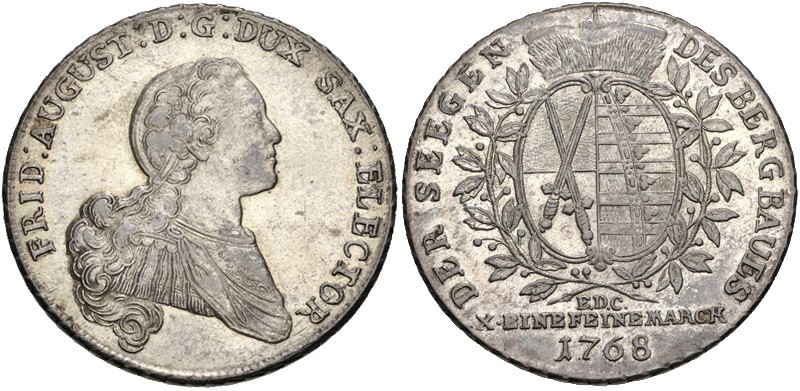
A 1768 Ausbeutetaler of Elector Frederick Augustus III of Saxony from the Dresden Mint. The inscription reads THE BLESSING OF MINING / X A FINE MARCK

The history of Saxon coinage or Meissen-Saxon coinage comprises three major periods: the high medieval regional pfennig period (bracteate period), the late medieval pfennig period and the thaler period, which ended with the introduction of the mark in 1871/72. Rich silver deposits, which were discovered near Freiberg after the middle of the 12th century, helped Saxony to a leading position in German coinage.

The Saxon pfennigs (Sachsenpfennige) minted in eastern Saxony are also included, as described in Walther Haupt's Sächsischer Münzkunde ("Saxon Coinage"). They were minted on the basis of the Carolingian monetary reform, on which the oldest Meissen coinage is based. The different names of these pfennig types indicate a still unclear position within medieval numismatics.

== Hochrandpfennig (Sachsenpfennig) ==
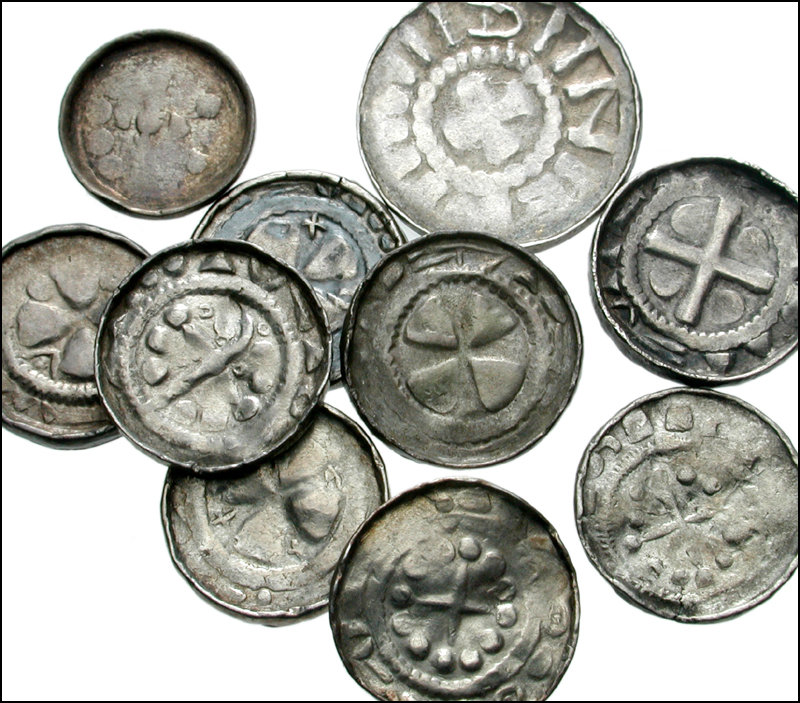
Sachsenpfennige (wooden church, beam cross, cloverleaf cross and crosier pfennig)

The 10th and 11th century pfennig type known as the Saxon pfennig (Sachsenpfennig) with a raised edge is the most common pfennig type of this time, along with the Otto Adelheid pfennig. Saxon pfennigs are the oldest coins minted in Saxony. The pfennigs of the Saxon imperial period with the inscription OTTO or ODDO in the portal of a church were presumably minted under Emperor Otto I (936–973) or soon afterwards in Magdeburg and belong to the oldest group of Saxon high-rimmed pfennigs.

The Margraves of Meissen continued to mint as ministeriales on behalf of the Roman-German Empire. Margrave Eckard I of Meissen (985–1002) had pfennigs minted in the imperial mint at Meissen. The denarius with the inscriptions EKKINHARD and MISSNI is the oldest known Meissen coin.

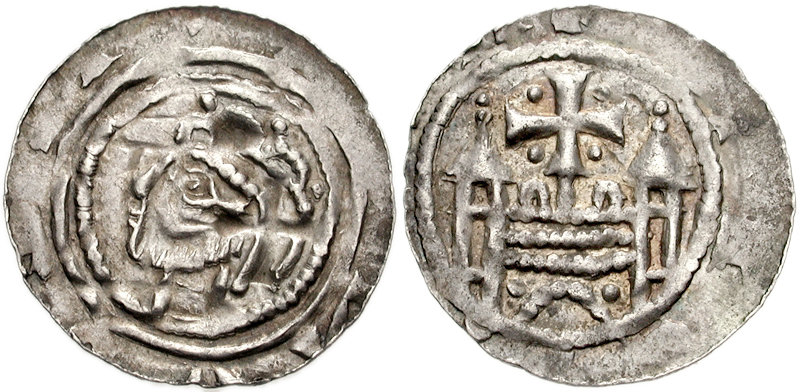
The so-called "thin pfennig", 11th century, Magdeburg Imperial Mint

.

=== Decline of pfennig coinage ===
The conversion of Charlemagne's pound into a monetary pound (Zählpfund) during the reign of the Frankish Emperor, Henry IV, (1056–1106) resulted in the obsolescence of pfennigs minted on both sides. The pound weight (Gewichtspfund) of 367 grammes was converted into a monetary pound of 240 pfennigs, the weight of which decreased continuously. The lighter pfennigs became larger in diameter. The sheet metal used for minting eventually became so thin that it could no longer be struck with lower and upper punches simultaneously in one operation. When embossing the so-called 'thin pfennigs' (Dünnpfennige), the blank had to be turned in order to emboss the opposite side. The stamp pressure on one side damaged the coin image on the other side. In order to achieve a good coin image, it made sense to dispense with the second punch and also to save the second work step.

This phenomenon probably led to the minting of bracteates beginning around 1140 under Margrave Conrad the Great (1123–1156).

== Bracteate period ==
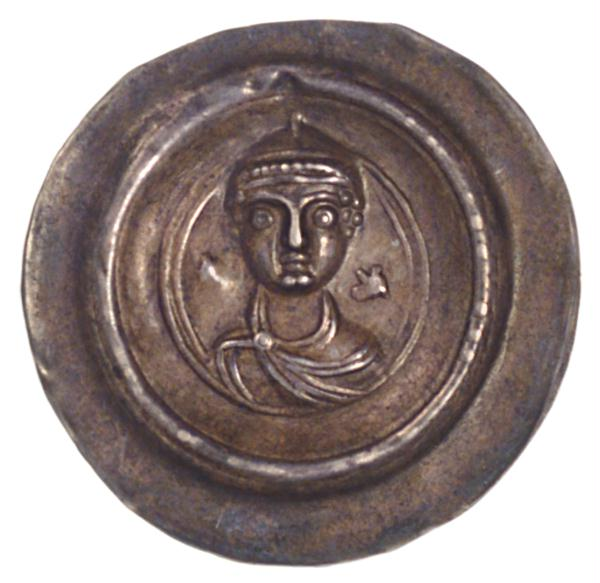
Margraviate of Meissen, Margrave Otto the Rich (1156–1190), bracteate

The name 'bracteate' first appeared at the end of the 17th century and is derived from the Latin word bractea ("tin"). At first it only occurs in the term nummus bracteatus, "tin coin". Perhaps the German expression blechen instead of bezahlen ("to pay") goes back to the days of tin money. Old documents, on the other hand, speak of Pfennige or Pfund Pfennige ("pound pfennigs"), in Latin, denarius or talentum denariorum.

The largest quantity of Meissen bracteates were minted between 1170 and 1300 by the first Meissen mint, the Freiberg Mint. From the 13th century it was the main state mint for the House of Wettin. In addition to pfennigs, halflings (Hälblinge) and quarters (Viertelchen) were also issued. Large payments were made in silver ingots.

The bracteates from all Meissen and Upper Lusatian mints were struck according to a uniform embossing style and monetary standard. The master minter at Freiberg was instructed not to strike more than 244 or 246 pfennigs from the (Prague) silver mark of 253 grammes. That corresponds to an average weight of a pfennig of a good 1 gramme. However, the highest average weight of Puschwitz bracteate finds from the early mintings around 1140 is only 0.811 grammes. At the end of the 13th and beginning of the 14th century, the average weight was 0.573 grammes.

The testing of the weight was checked al marco. In medieval coinage, this was checking the total weight of a certain number of coins instead of checking the weight of an individual piece. Given the uneven weight of individual pfennigs, it was obvious to bring the overweight ones down to the average weight simply with scissors by cutting off the edge. The clipping of pfennigs by money changers or private individuals for the purpose of illegally procuring precious metals was a capital offence for which the penalty was cutting off the right hand.

The pfennigs were only valid in their area of origin. The bracteate period is therefore also referred to as the period of the regional pfennig. Anyone who came from another currency area to trade had to exchange the currency they had brought with them for local coinage. The bill of exchange was part of the income of the mintmasters.

The cost of minting coins had to be covered by an annual fee-based exchange of the pfennigs: twelve old ones for nine or ten new ones. In Freiberg's city law it was determined that only the mint master or judge himself was allowed to devalue expired pfennigs. The fragile pfennigs were carried in tin cans.

=== Bracteate mints in Saxony ===
The following mints in Saxony produced bracteate coins:

- Bautzen
- Colditz
- Freiberg
- Gotha
- Leipzig
- Weimar
- Wittenberg

=== Dynastic bracteates ===
Numerous independent dynasties in the Wettin region were given the imperial regale of minting rights. These included:

- Lords of Apolda
- Lords of Bieberstein
- Counts of Brehna
- Lords of Colditz
- Burgraves of Dohna
- Lords of Eilenburg
- Burgraves of Leisnig
- Lords of Lobdeburg
- Burgraves of Meissen
- Burgraves of Neuenburg
- Lords of Pack
- Vogts of Plauen
- Lords of Waldenburg at Wolkenstein
- Vogts of Weida-Gera
- Counts of Wettin

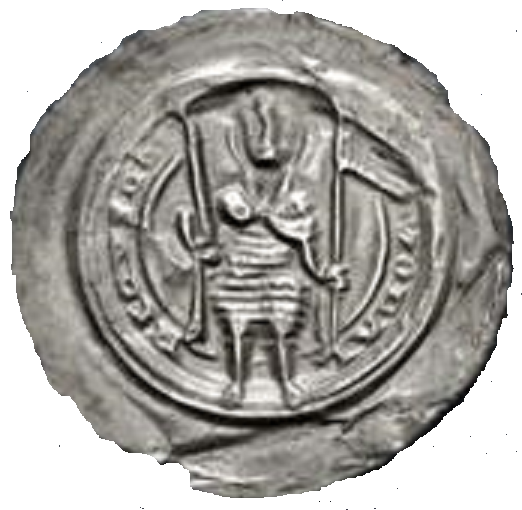
Counts of Wettin, Ulrich, 1187–1206, diameter 35 mm, 0.73 g (clipped)

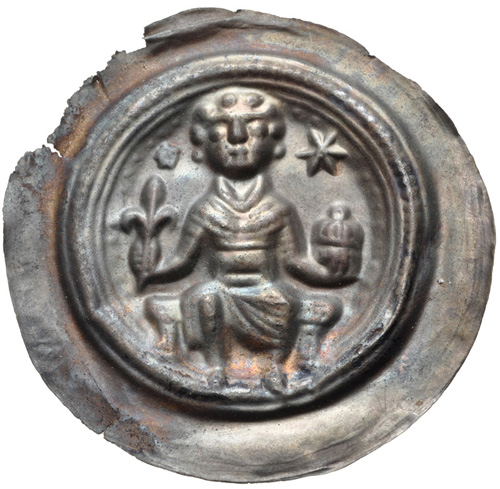
Lordship of Eilenburg, Otto (1191–1234), diameter 37 mm; 1.12 g

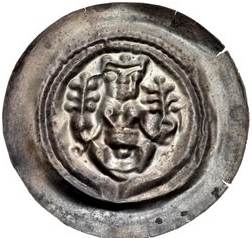
Lords of Lobdeburg (1230–1270), unconfirmed, diameter 32 mm, 0.58 g

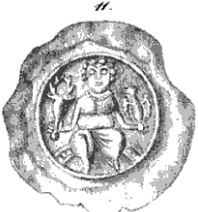
Burgraviate of Dohna, probably Henry II (1180–1225), Donian bracteate

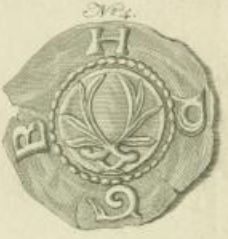
Burggrafschaft Dohna, Henry III (1239–1256), Donian bracteate

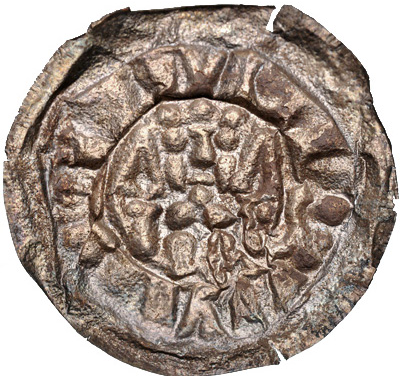
Vogts of Weida-Gera, Vogtei of Henry VIII or IV, 1281–1320, diameter 43 mm, 0.69 g

The increasing power of the Meissen margraves in the 14th century led, with a few exceptions, to the end of minting by imperial ministeriales.

=== Episcopal bracteates ===
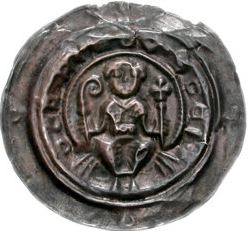
Bishopric of Naumburg, Berthold II of Meissen

The Bishops of Naumburg exercised their right to mint coins in Strehla on the Elbe in conjunction with the Margrave of Meissen.

The Bishops of Meissen were also the lords of miners and mints and had bracteates issued. At the end of the 12th century, mines were driven into the Scharfenberg on the Elbe. Later, the two episcopal castles, Wurzen and Stolpen became potential places for minting. The last episcopal bracteates were minted towards the end of the 13th century.

As an abbey authorized to issue coins, Pegau Abbey in Pegau also minted bracteates. These have a large crutch cross and usually an inscription of the name as an unmistakable mark. Because of their consistent and high quality silver, they were popular and even re-stamped. Restrikes are known for the Burgraves of Meissen, the Vogts of Pegau Abbey, Margrave Theodoric, the Count of Brehna and Archbishops of Magdeburg.

=== Chronology of the Meissen bracteates (Margraviate of Meissen) ===
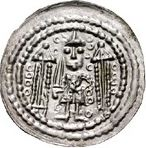
Conrad the Great (1123–1156), oldest Meissen type

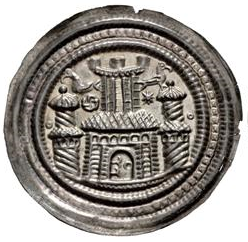
Conrad the Great (1123–1156), diameter 36 mm, 1.00 g

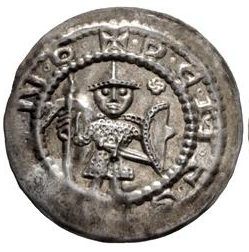
Conrad the Great (1123–1156), diameter 30 mm; 0.85g

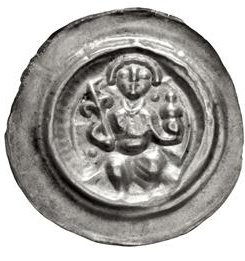
Theodoric the Oppressed (1197–1221), diameter 33 mm, 0.86 g

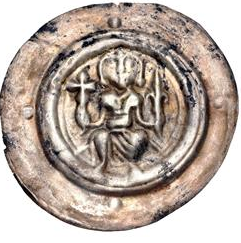
Henry the Illustrious (1221–1288), diameter 42mm; 1.08g

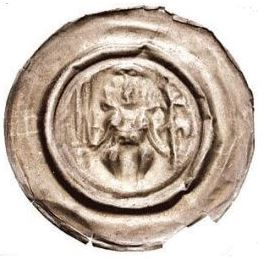
Henry the Illustrious (1221–1288), minted around 1250

The chronology of the Meissen bracteates is difficult. Except in the early days, the names of the mint lords are only exceptionally found on the pfennigs. A rough classification was made by Haupt:

Period	Dimension/feature	remark
Around 1140/1150	Diameter up to 37 mm, flat stamping	The oldest bracteates were stamped with forged steel dies. The die cuts are testimonies to Romanesque portable art. The coin image extends to the edge.
Post 1150 to late 12th century	Gradual reduction in diameter down to 20 mm	The coin weight hardly decreased. The bracteates had become thicker and therefore more break- and pressure-resistant. A wide and high beaded ring enclosing the coin design increased its flexural strength.
Around 1200 to about 1250	Diameter up to 42 mm, larger profiling	The coin die made of cast bronze saved the need for die cutting. The casting technique required greater profiling and larger diameters. As before, the bracteates have a stiffening ring, an "enthroned prince" became a typical coin image.
About 1250 to 1300	"Gritty" surface, large diameters	Bracteates became mass-produced due to the high silver yield from the mines. The slightly rough surface of the cast bronze stamp was no longer smoothed.
around 1300	Bulging almost to the shape of a hat	Several planchets laid on top of each other were formed in one minting process. The coin image merges into the edge.

For the export trade, the regional pfennig with its limited scope and obligation to exchange it every year was a major obstacle. A unified currency across larger areas was required. Higher denominations were needed, not just pfennigs.

The regional pfennig period ended under Margrave Frederick II (1323–1349).

== Groschen period ==
After the replacement of the pfennig by the broad groschen (grossi lati) introduced by Margrave Frederick II in 1338/39, the late medieval groschen period began. In Haupt's Sächsischer Münzkunde, the word Groschen is a popular term for the Latin grossus, which roughly means "fat". For larger amounts of money, the Schock, worth 60 small Schockgroschen or 20 new groschen, and the mark, worth 48 Schockgroschen were minted.

The new groschen was issued by the Freiberg mint based on the Prague groschen which had been minted in Bohemia since 1300. When changing over the currency in the Margraviate of Meissen, as in the Kingdom of Bohemia, Italian financial advisors were consulted.

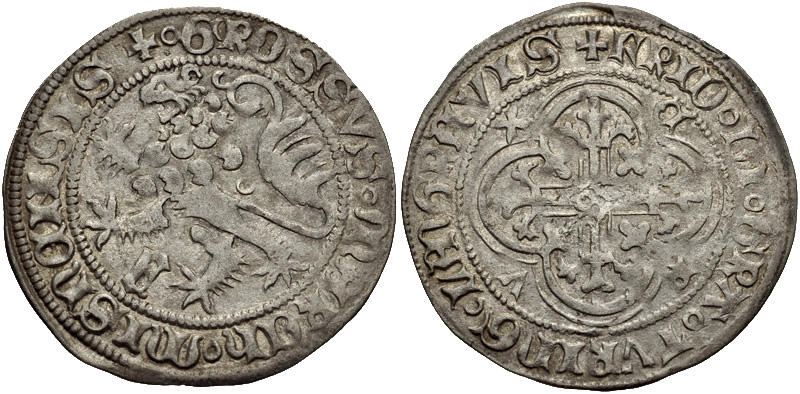
Landgrave Frederick the Peaceful (1406–1440), Meissen groschen with letter "f" and reference "Ringel", Freiberg

The currency changeover to the new, lighter Rhenish Gulden as the basis for Meissen's groschen coinage took place in stages from 1368 to 1369. In addition to groschen, pfennigs and hellers were minted. The groschen was worth 9 or 12 pfennigs, the pfennig, 2 hellers. Alongside the Prague groschen, the Meissen groschen became the leading monetary unit of Central Europe.

At the end of the 14th and 15th centuries, the House of Wettin established, in addition to their main mint in Freiberg, other mints in Sangerhausen, Zwickau, Gotha, Leipzig, Weimar, Colditz, Wittenberg and Langensalza, some of which were only temporarily in operation. The Freiberg Mint remained the primary state mint until it was eventually closed.

The Colditz Mint was owned by the Electress Margaret, wife of Elector Friedrich II (1428–1464). An extraordinary event in the history of coins in Saxony is that the Elector paid his wife as compensation for the high life estate in 1456 set up a mint in Colditz and allowed her to mint her own coins there. The so-called Margarethengroschen with an additional "M" in the inscription testify to these coins.

As a result of the high spending policy of Margrave William I the One-Eyed (1382–1407), the country and its population were heavily burdened.

Foreign towns countered the increasing debasement of coins with countermarks of Meissen groschen that were still in good condition. It was not until 1412 that Frederick the Quarrelsome (1381–1428) succeeded in stabilizing the pfennig currency on the basis of 20 Schildgroschen to a Rhenish gulden.

Saxony had to recognize the Rhenish gold gulden in order to support long-distance trade. From 1456 it was at last minted in the large commercial metropolis of Leipzig.

The discovery of new, rich silver deposits in the upper Ore Mountains at Schneeberg and Annaberg led to another mining period in Saxony in the second half of the 15th century. The newly established mine mints at Schneeberg, Zwickau (where minting had been shut down since 1449), Annaberg and Buchholz had to cover the state's increasing financial obligations by minting a huge number of coins.

The almost identical coin mandates of the Ernestine and Albertines in May 1500 announced a planned transition to the large silver currency on 4 July. Under these regulations, the new silver gulden (Guldengroschen) was established, and a full a full Rhenish gold gulden was valued at 7 Schreckenbergers or 21 Zinsgroschen; the Meissen-Saxon groschen was superseded after 262 years.

The Meissen gulden, used as a coin of account up to the 19th century, goes back to the Saxon coinage regulations of 9 August 1490, according to which the gold gulden in Saxony was set at a value of 21 groschen.

=== Special Meissen-Saxon groschen ===
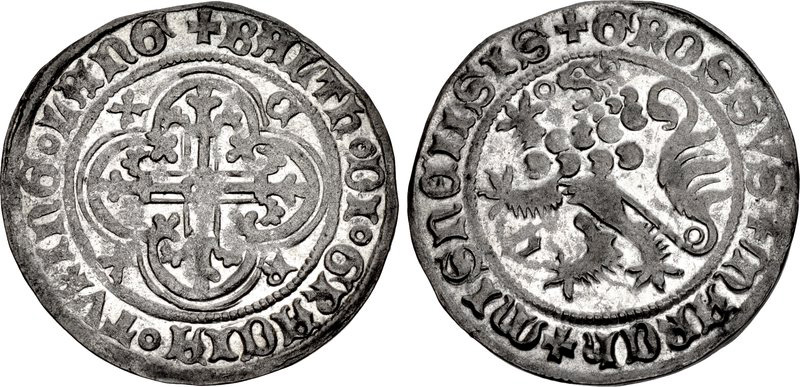
Fürstengroschen Landgrave Balthasar of Thuringia, Freiberg Mint (abbreviation BALTH), 1405–1406.

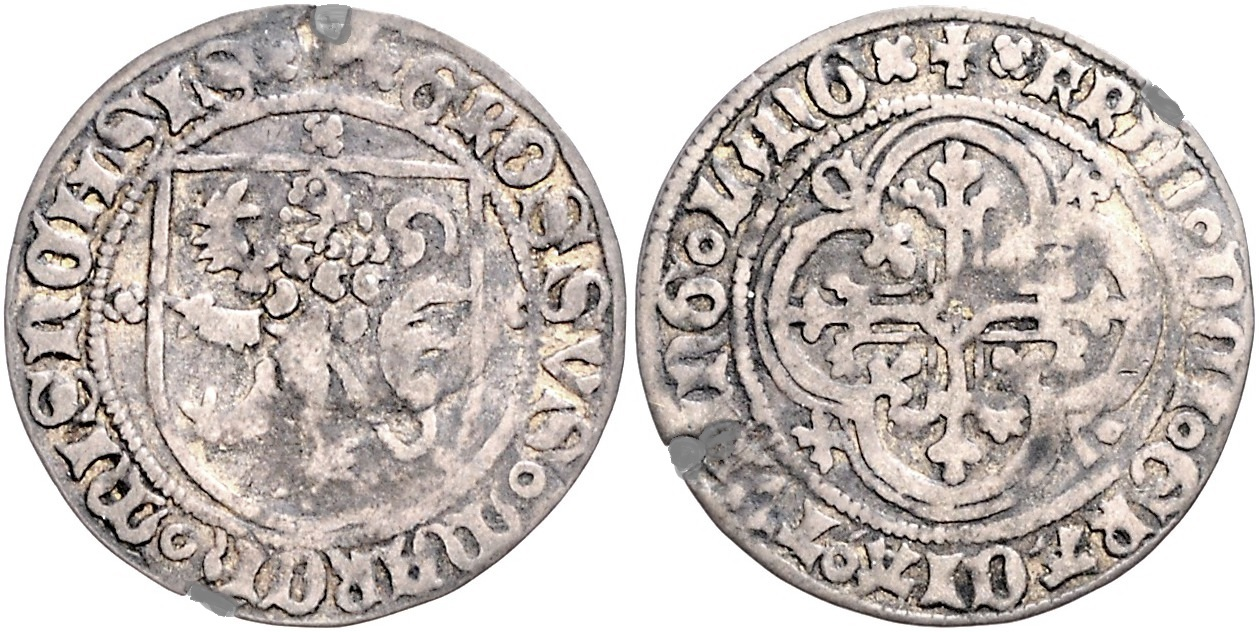
Schildgroschen of Frederick IV the Quarrelsome, Gotha Mint, minted based on the first issue of 1405/1412. However, this identical shield penny was not minted until 1425/1428.

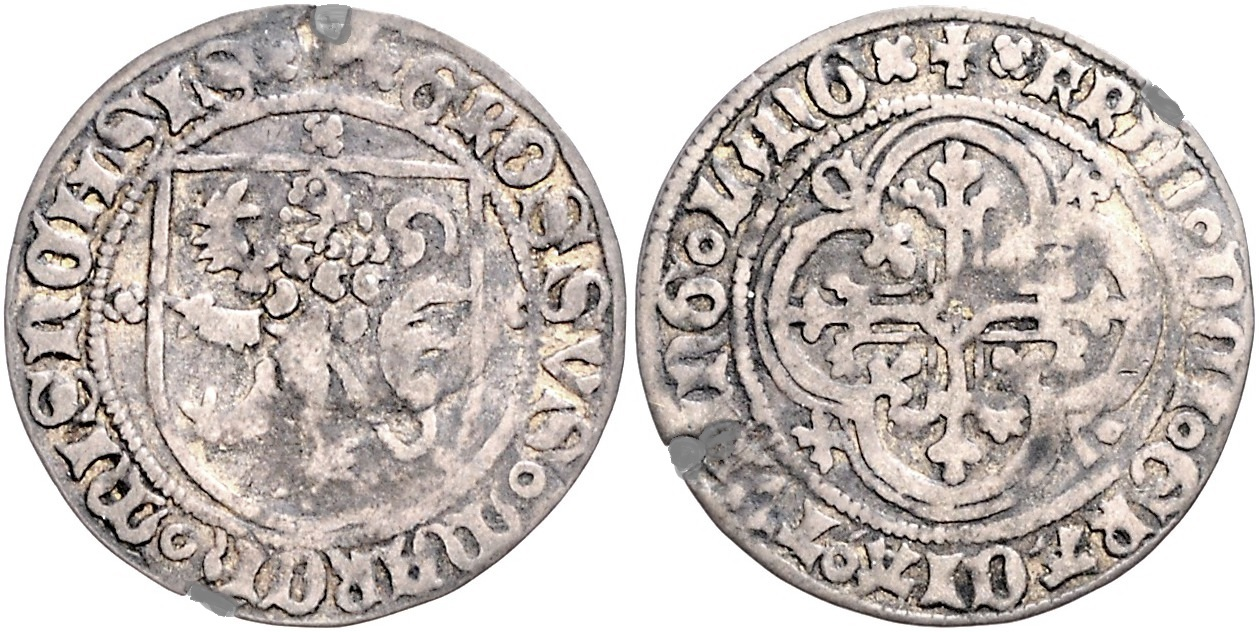
Schildgroschen of Frederick II the Gentle with Landgrave Frederick the Peaceful of Thuringia and his brother Sigismund, 1428/1431, Freiberg Mint

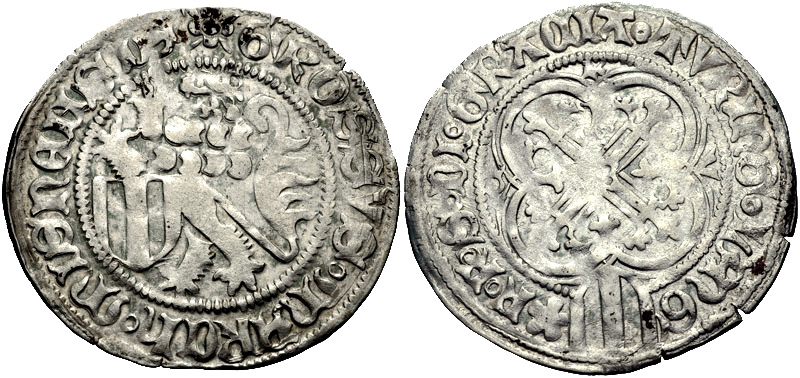
Pfahlschildgroschen Frederick II the Meek with Landgrave Frederick the Peaceful of Thuringia and his brother Sigismund, Freiberg Mint, 1431–1436

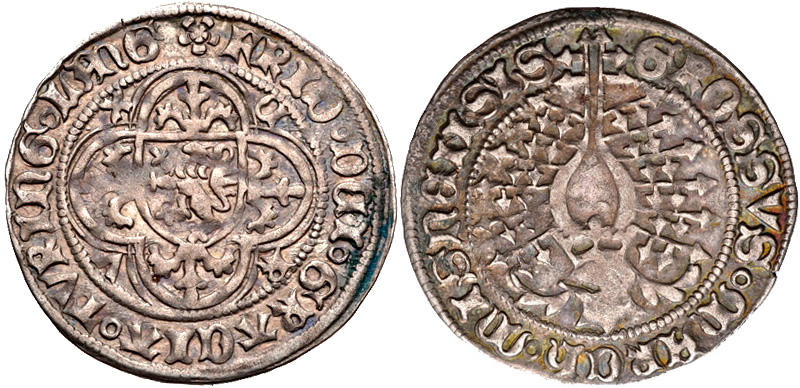
Margrave Frederick the Quarrelsome, Freiberg Helmgroschen, 1405–1411

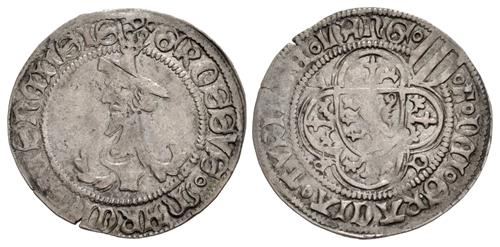
Elector Frederick II Judenkopfgroschen (Oberwähr), Freiberg Mint, 1444 to c. 1451

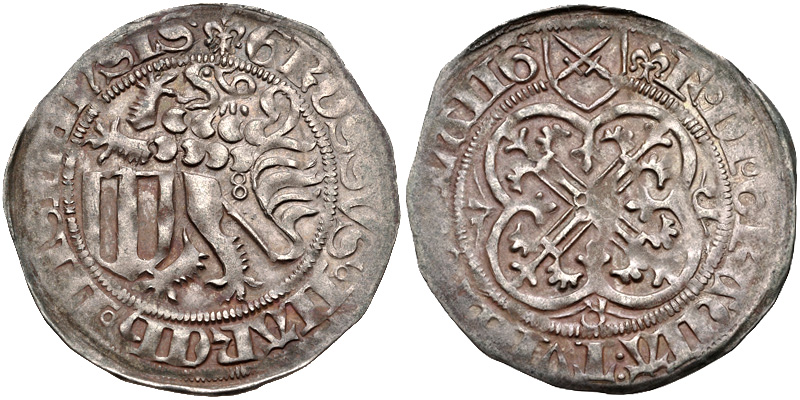
Schwertgroschen of Frederick the Gentle, 1457 to 1464, mint master's mark lily, Leipzig Mint, with double ringlet mark

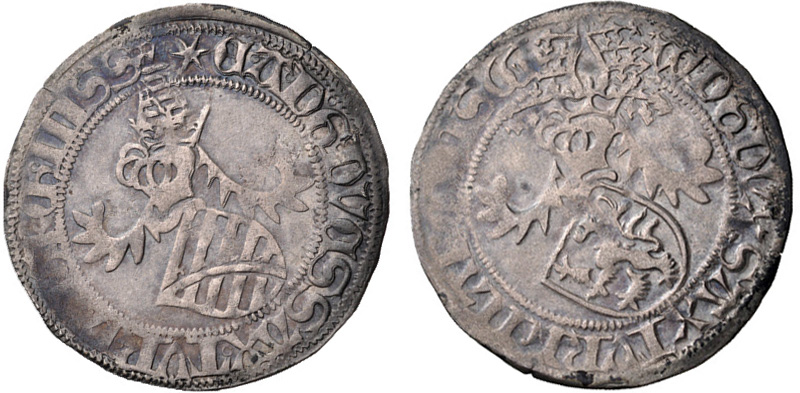
Elector Ernest, Duke Albert, Duke William III, Horngroschen from 1466, Leipzig Mint

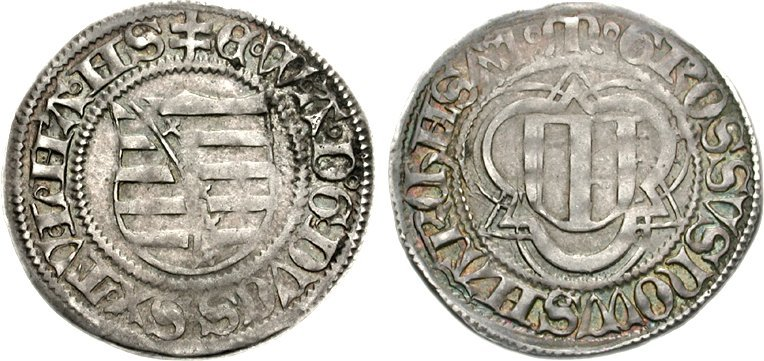
Elector Ernest, Duke Albert, Duke William III with Electress Margaret (1475–1482), Spitzgroschen from 1475, Colditz Mint (Margarethengroschen)

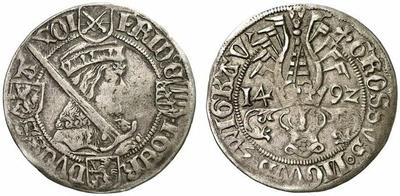
Elector Frederick III, John and Duke George, Bartgroschen from 1492, Zwickau and Schneeberg Mints

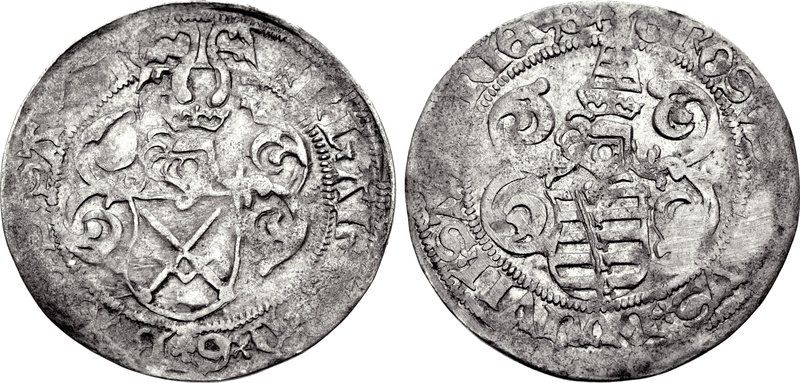
Elector Frederick III with John and Duke Albert, Schneeberg, Zinsgroschen from 1498
- The Fürstengroschen ("prince's groschen") is a Meissen groschen, which Landgrave Balthasar of Thuringia (1349/79–1406) had struck from 1393 in his newly established mint at Sangerhausen and at the Freiberg State Mint. A special feature of these groschen is that, from 1396, the mint can be identified by the abbreviation of its name. On the reverse the character "b" is embossed in front of the Meissen lion rampant, which is a feature of the Fürstengroschen. On the death of Balthasar in 1406, the minting of the Fürstengroschen was discontinued and his mint in Sangerhausen was closed.
- The Schildgroschen ("shield groschen), often subdivided into the schildiger Groschen ("shielded groschen") and Pfahlschildgroschen ("arrow shield groschen) or Landsberg groschen, are late mediaeval Meissen groschen coins, which were first minted after the coin reform of 1405. The preferred name of the coin, Schildgroschen, is based on the fact that the older groschen were not stamped with a sign. With the minting of these groschens the previous design, that had been standard since the Meissen groschen were first issued, the image on the coin was changed. The Schildgroschen type, in the form of the Pfahlschildgroschen, was minted until 1456.
  The Hessian Schildgroschen, also known as the Kronichte Groschen and Zweischildgroschen, was a coin based on the Meissen Schildgroschen and which are very similar to the Meissen-Saxon Schildgroschen; they are mentioned here for reference.
- The Helmgroschen ("helmet groschen") or Thuringian groschen was a true-value (guthaltig) groschen minted under Margrave Frederick the Quarrelsome of Meissen and Landgrave Balthasar of Thuringia in the Margraviate of Meissen and the Landgraviate of Thuringia from 1405 to 1411, mainly intended for the Thuringian possessions. The name of the groschen is derived from the helmet with a large Thuringian crest on the back. The helmet groschen were the first Meissen groschen to deviate from the typical coin design on both sides. With these groschen with their eye-catching design, the Wettins wanted to support the currency, which had been weakened by the ongoing coin devaluation.
- The Judenkopfgroschen ("Jew's head groschen") was designed as external trading currency (Oberwähr) minted under Elector Frederick II the Meek of Saxony (1428–1464) in accordance with the coinage regulations from 1444 to about 1451. His brother, Duke William III the Brave (1445–1482) also participated in this project. The name of the coin is derived from the reverse side with the Meissen crest with a man's head, the so-called "Jew's head".
- The Schwertgroschen ("sword groschen") is a Saxon groschen minted in accordance with the coinage act of 1456/57, which corresponds to the Meissen groschen type and was minted from 1457 to 1464 in Freiberg, Colditz and Leipzig. Above the cross fleury in the quatrefoil is the shield with crossed electoral swords, which give the Schwertgroschen its name. From 1461 to 1464 it was minted as internal currency (Beiwähr).
- The Horngroschen ("horn groschen") were minted from 1465 to 1469 by Dukes Ernest and Albert together with their uncle, William (1465-1482) It was the first groschen for 123 years that the Wettins had minted with a year date. The weakened Saxon currency was to be replaced by a completely new and stable currency after the efforts to achieve that with the coin reforms of 1444 and 1456/57 by creating a two-tier groschen currency in the form of an external (Oberwähr) and internal one (Bewähr) had failed.
- The Spitzgroschen ("point groschen") was minted sold under Elector Ernest (1464/85–1486), his brother Duke Albert the Bold (1464/85–1500) and their uncle Duke William III the Brave (1445-1482) from 1475 to 1482 iaw the coinage decree of 28 December 1474, in order to dispel public mistrust of the equivalent Horngroschen made of alloyed silver. In the Electorate of Saxony under Elector Maurice (1541-1547-1553) and Elector Augustus (1553-1586) there were restrikes from 1547 to 1553.
- The so-called Margarethengroschen ("Margaret groschen") are Saxon groschen minted from 1456 to 1477 by the Colditz Mint with an additional "M" at the beginning or within the inscription. The "M" refers to Margaret (c. 1416 – 1486), wife of Elector Frederick II (1428–1464) of Saxony. Coins from 1456 are technically illegal, because she put her name before that of the Elector and also had her own coins made, although she only received minting rights from the Emperor in September 1463.
- The Bartgroschen ("bearded groschen") is the name of the coin minted from 1492 to 1493 with a circulation of 205,000 pieces. They were issued by the Zwickau and Schneeberg mints and bore a portrait of Frederick III of Saxony (1486–1525). The groschen were the first coins in Saxon coinage history with a portrait of the regent.
- Zinsgroschen ("interest groschen"), Mutgroschen or Schneeberger are the names of Saxon groschen coins minted from 1496, with which certain taxes (interest) were paid. This new type of groschen was minted for 3 1/2 decades and was the model for 16th century groschen.
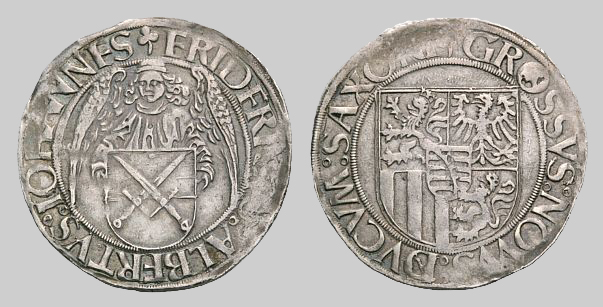
  Elector Frederick III the Wise with Dukes John the Steadfast and Albert the Bold, Annaberg Schreckenberger, undated, (1498/1499)
- Schreckenbergers from the silver mines of the Schreckenberg were minted in accordance with coinage act of 18 August 1498. These new, larger Großgroschen had a value of 3 groschen and were issued to a fineness 861/1000. There were 7 Schreckenbergers to a Rhenish gulden.

The Zinsgroschen minted from Schneeberg silver and the Schreckenberger prepared the way for the new silver gulden currency introduced from 1500 on the lines of the Tyrolean model and which were the first Saxon thaler coins.

== thaler period ==
With the beginning of the thaler period in 1500, all mintmaster marks are known. These mints were at:

- Annaberg
- Bautzen
- Buchholz
- Dresden
- Freiberg
- Leipzig
- Schneeberg
- Zwickau

=== State thalers (1500–1571) ===
At the end of the 15th century, new technical and economic methods in Saxon mining led to an unusually high silver yield. This led Elector Frederick III the Wise (1486–1525) and his brother John the Constant (1486/1525–1532), in agreement with George the Bearded (1500–1539), as representative of his father Albert the Bold (1464/85–1500) to promulgate the so-called Leipzig Coinage Act of 1500. According to this, a groschen (Guldengroschen) was to be struck and equated for a (Rhenish) gulden. The thaler (so-called Klappmützentaler), was initially called a gulden or a guldengroschen, and was the silver equivalent of the Rhenish gulden.

On the Locumtenenstaler minted by Elector Frederick the Wise of Saxony, his status as an Imperial Vicar appears for the first time in 1507, inscribed in the form "Imperique locumtenens generalis" (Latin = Imperial Governor General). These are the first vicariate coins in Saxony. The other Schautaler of Frederick the Wise (1522) was attributed to Martin Luther's honorary memory and could also be a medal.

During the time of the Saxon currency separation, the common coinage agreed between the Ernestines and Albertines under the partition of Leipzig in 1485 was temporarily lifted from 1530 to the end of 1533. When the Ernestines lost their electoral dignity to the Albertines in 1547, the coinage that had been previously minted in brotherly cooperation was finally ended. The new Elector Maurice (1541–1547–1553) only minted coins in his own name. A new period began, a separate coinage history under the Albertine electoral line of the House of Saxony.

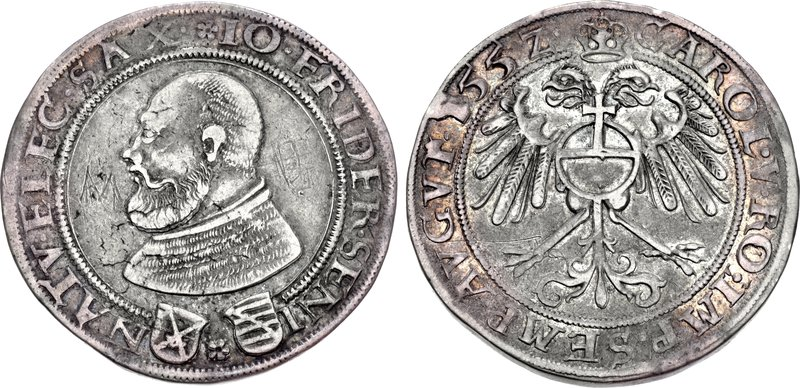
Duchy of Saxony, thaler of John Frederick the Magnanimous after his imprisonment, 1552, Saalfeld Mint.

The coinage of the Ernestine line and later and subsidiary lines in the remaining extensive Thuringian lands are also part of Saxon coin history, but can be treated separately in their diversity. The coinage history of the Duchy of Saxony or the Saxon-Ernestine family covers the period from 1547 to 1572 in the remaining Thuringian possessions of the Ernestines. This is the time after the Battle of Mühlberg up to the partition of the Ernestine duchy into Saxe-Coburg-Eisenach and Saxe-Weimar (Saxe-Old-Weimar) in 1572.

The Albertine Elector Augustus (1553–1586) centralized coinage by combining all state coin production into a single mint. The new Dresden Mint became the central mint for the entire Electorate. On Augustus's accession to the Imperial Minting Ordinance of 1571, the second phase of the thaler currency began.

- thaler coins based on the Saxon monetary standard:
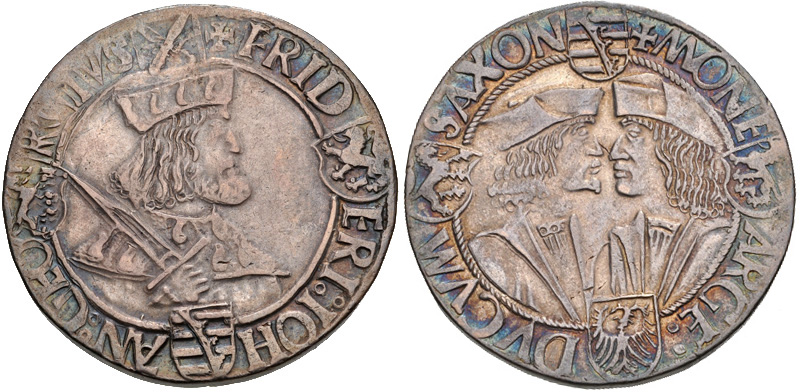
Elector Frederick III and Dukes John and George, Gulden (Klappmützentaler), undated, Mmz. Cross (1512–1523), Annaberg

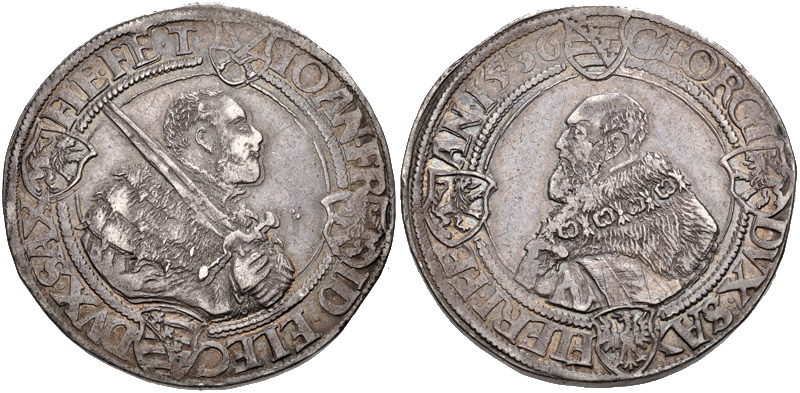
Kurfürst John Frederick the Magnanimous und Duke George, Guldengroschen, 1536, Buchholz

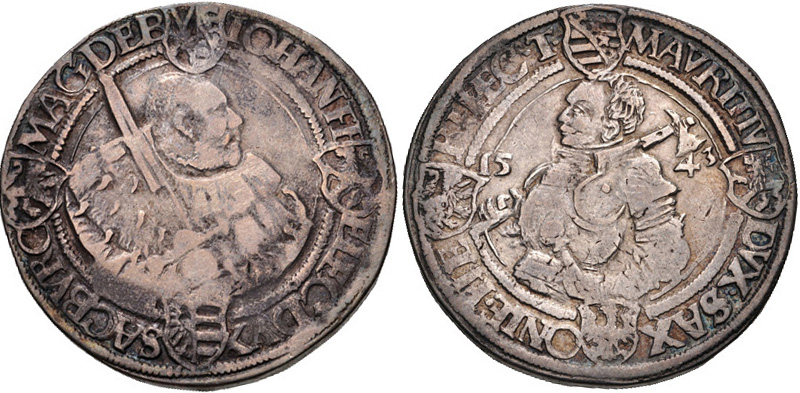
Elector John Frederick the Magnanimous (portrait with electoral sword over his shoulder) and Duke Maurice (portrait with battle axe over his shoulder), Guldengroschen from 1543, Buchholz

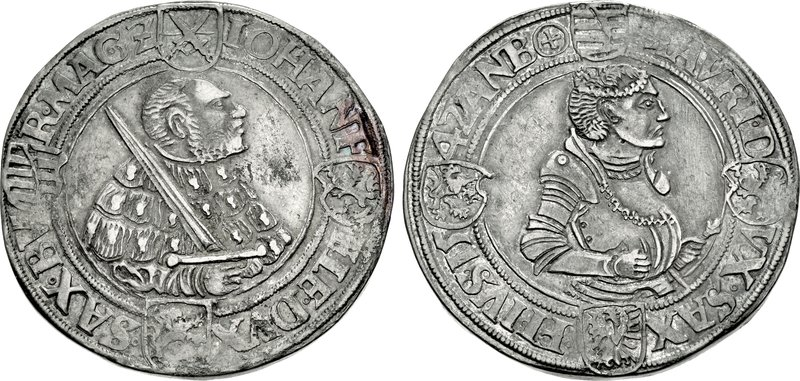
Elector John Frederick the Magnanimous and Duke Maurice, Guldengroschen, 1542, Annaberg

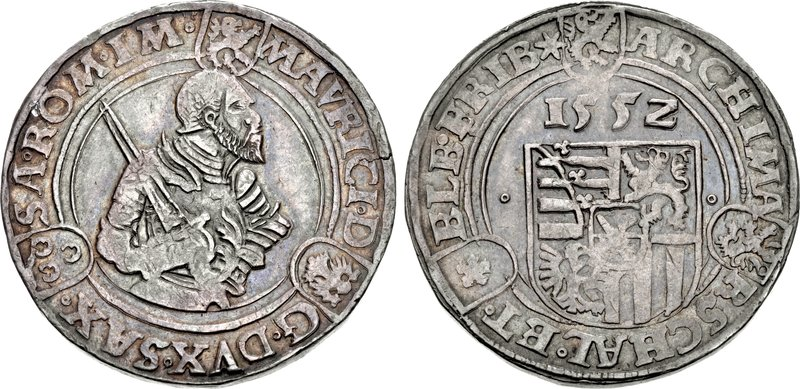
Elector Maurice, Guldengroschen, 1552, Freiberg. Definitive coin separation from 1547

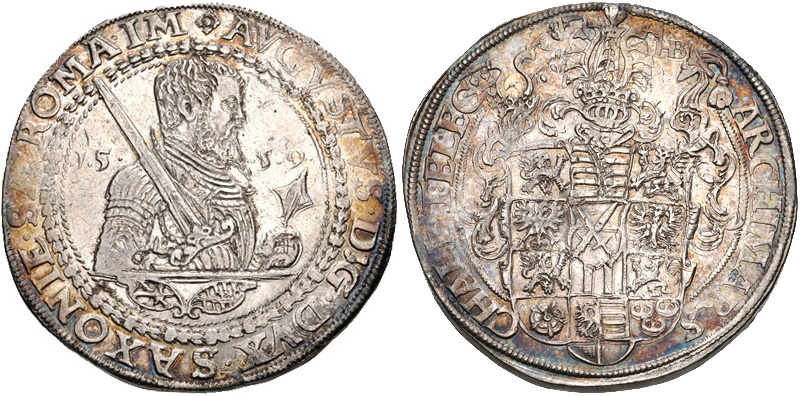
Elector Augustus, Guldengroschen, 1559, Dresden

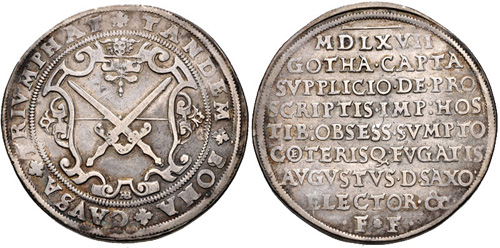
Elector Augustus, thaler issued on the capture of Gotha (1567), Dresden

=== Imperial thalers (post-1571) ===
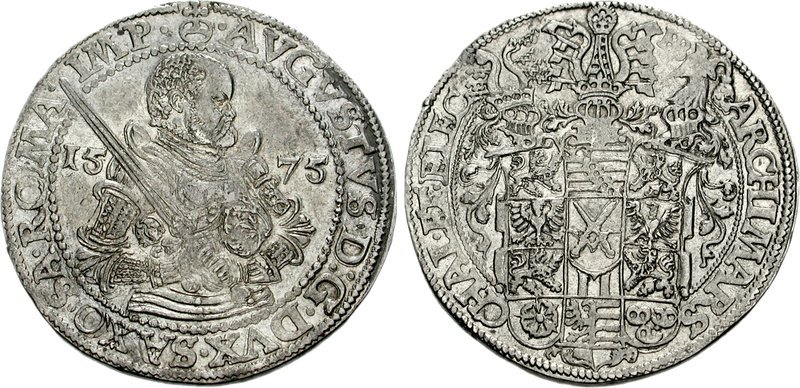
Elector Augustus, Reichstaler, 1575

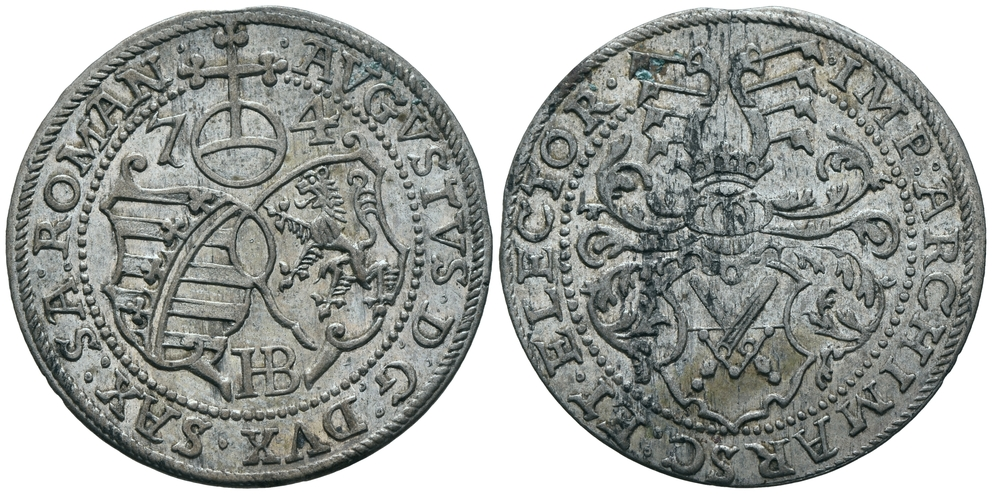
1/24 Reichstaler (Groschen), 1571

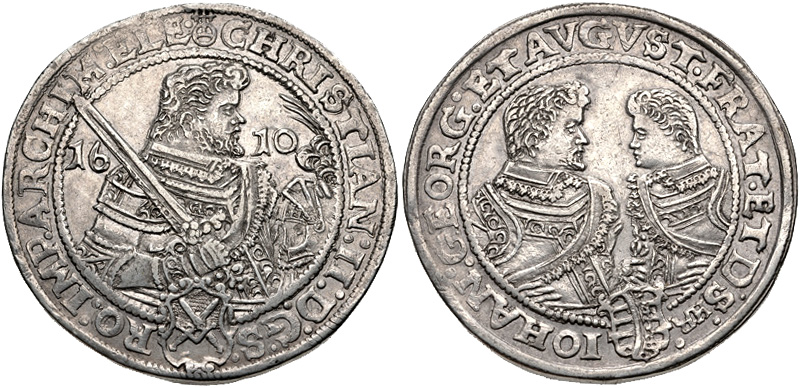
Dreibrüdertaler, from 1610

In 1571, Elector Augustus and the estates of the Upper Saxon Circle and Lower Saxon Circle joined the Augsburg Reichsmünzordnung of 1559. The 10 Imperial Circles, into which the Holy Roman Empire of the German Nation was divided, was responsible for monitoring compliance with the imperial coinage system. All coins come from the Dresden Mint.

Thalers after accession to the Reichsmünzordnung of 1571:

- 1571–1667 Imperial Minting Standard (Reichsmünzfuß): 9 Reichstaler to the Fine Mark

Nominal	Weight (g)	Fineness (0/00)
Reichstaler at 24 groschen	29.23	888.89
1/2 Reichsthaler valued at 12 Groschen	14.62	888.89
1/4 Reichstaler valued at 6 Groschen	7.31	888.89
1/8 Reichstaler valued at 3 Groschen	3.61	888.89
1/24 Reichstaler (1 Groschen)	2.15	500
Dreier or Dreyer (1/4 Groschen)	0.85	312.5
Pfennig (1/12 Groschen)	0.34	250

The golden guldens and double guldens, which were minted after Electoral Saxony joined the imperial coinage system, are not part of the Saxon denominations of the imperial coinage system. The Reichsgulden at 21 Groschen (1584) is a minted coin of account.

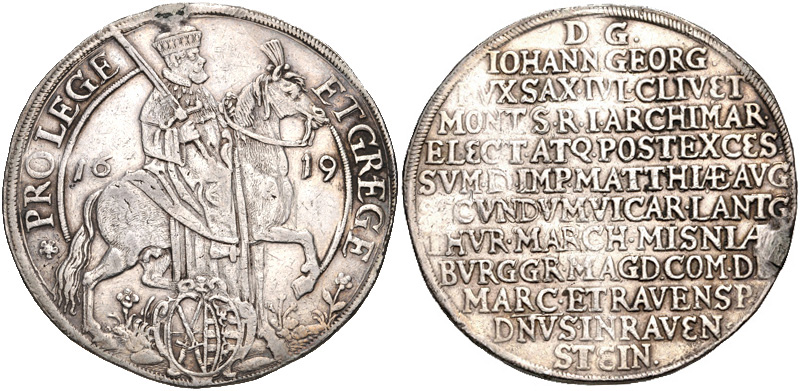
Elector John George I, vicariate thaler, 1619

The electors of Saxony, who were rich in silver, could afford to produce extensive commemorative coins in addition to circulation coins. The Saxon vicariate coins minted from 1612 are commemorative coins of the Electors of Saxony, whom they portray as representatives of the Emperor in imperial territories under Saxon law coined during the time of the imperial throne. They shared the Imperial Vicariate with the Rhineland.

Between 1571 and 1667, the Upper Saxon Circle tried to comply with the imperial monetary standard. The decline in silver mining and high cost of minting small change and the consequent shortages led to the Kipper and Wipper inflation of 1619 to 1623, combined with the establishment of numerous Kipper mints.

=== Kipper and Wipper period (1620–1623) ===
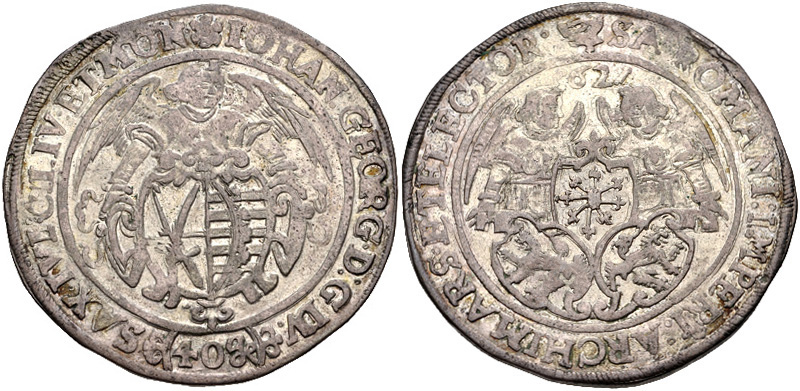
Elector John George I, 40 Kippergroschen (Kippertaler for 40 groschen) 1621, Kipper mints, Dresden

The monopoly of the Dresden Mint was broken with the establishment of numerous Kipper mints. The great resemblance of the interim coins to the high-quality Schreckenberger or Engelsgroschen minted in Saxony and Thuringia between 1498 and 1571 probably made them coins popular in Electoral Saxony. The coins could not be objected to, because they were not thalers or their subdivisions, but groschen pieces, i.e. state coins (Landesmünzen), which did not have to conform to the imperial coinage regulations. The smallest coins, which were one-sided copper pfennigs, were produced by the Grünthal Hammer Mill.

The complete disruption of the financial system forced Electoral Saxony to return to the imperial coin standard in 1623. The Reichsmünzordnung had not officially been repealed.

=== Zinna and Leipzig standard (1667–1690–1763) ===
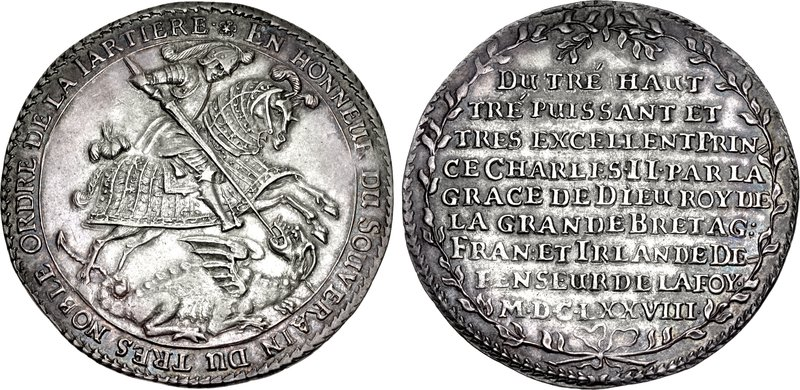
Elector John George II, Kuranttaler (Hosenbandtaler), 1678, 23.32 g. Kuranttaler were only minted in exceptional cases.

After the end of the Thirty Years' War, there was a second or lesser Kipper period, which Electoral Brandenburg and Electoral Saxony ended, however, by agreeing on a currency standard in Zinna in 1667 that reflected the increased price of silver. That same year, the short-term minting of state coins for Upper Lusatia at the Bautzen Mint was halted due to failure. The 2/3 thaler (2/3 Kuranttaler) or gulden valued at 16 groschen became the new main denomination. The Kurantthaler valued at 24 groschen, previously called Reichsthaler, was not minted with a few exceptions. In payment transactions, the thaler was a coin of account worth 24 groschen. That is why the denomination 24/EINEN/TALER is stamped on pfennig pieces. The thaler referred to the non-minted Rechnungsthaler. This currency was no longer based on the resolutions of the Reichstag, but on the agreement between the states of Electoral Brandenburg and Electoral Saxony. The Reichsthaler was only minted as a Speciesreichsthaler valued at 28 groschen for the payment obligation of the Saxon mining administration.

The coinage according to the 1667 Treaty of Zinna

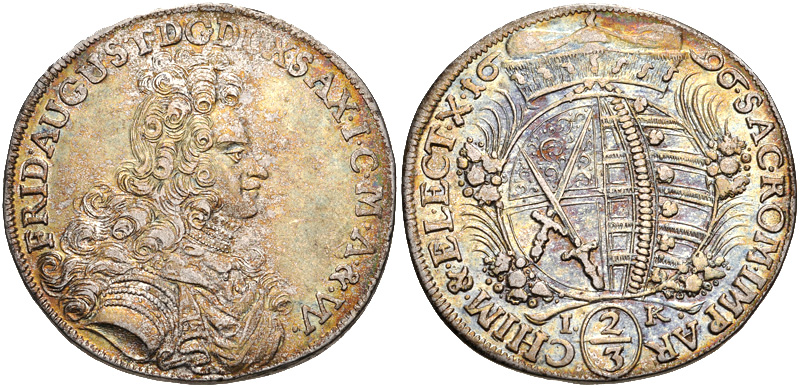
Elector Frederick Augustus I (Augustus the Strong), 2/3 Kuranttaler (gulden), 1696, Dresden. A clear distinction must be made between this minted gulden and the fictitious accounting "gulden" (Meissen gulden).

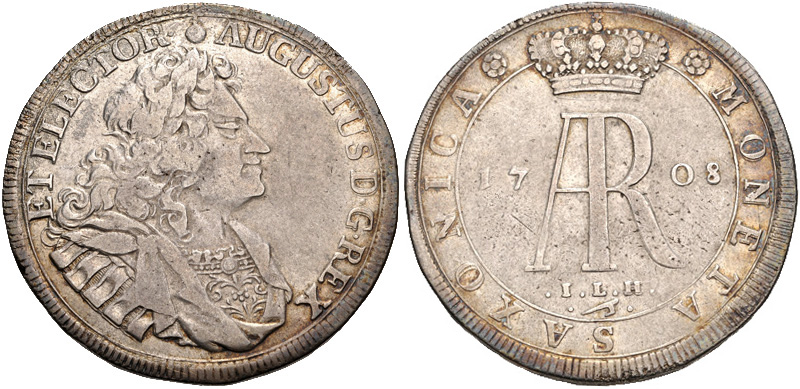
King Augustus II, Speciesreichstaler valued at 32 groschen from 1708, still minted to the imperial standard; with royal title but no reference to Poland. Frederick Augustus had this taler minted after he had to renounce the Polish throne.

- Zinna mint standard 1667-1690: 10 1/2 Kuranttaler against the fine mark

Nominal	Weight (g)	Fineness (0/00)
Kuranttaler at 24 Groschen		
2/3 Kuranttaler at 16 Groschen	16.7	888.89
1/3 Kuranttaler at 8 Groschen	9.74	760.42
1/6 Kuranttaler 4 Groschen	4.87	760.42
Groschen	1.99	465.28
Dreier or Dreyer (1/4 Groschen)	0.90	250
Pfennig (1/12 Groschen)	0.35	204.86

In 1690, the continued rise in the price of silver required another currency adjustment. The result was the Leipzig standard, which the Regensburg Reichstag declared in 1735 to be the new coin standard. The Speciesreichstaler were still minted to imperial coin regulations, but with an increased value of 32 groschen.

- Coinage to the Leipzig standard (1690-1763): 12 Kuranttaler to the fine mark

Coinage minted to the Leipzig standard, that is the Kuranttaler in the same denominations as before, was issued between 1693 and 1733 with a different weight and fineness.

Small change was minted to the Torgau mint standard. New denominations were 1/12 thaler (double groschen) and 1/48 thaler (1/2 groschen).

In the Electorate of Saxony, low-value Schuesselpfennigs ("dish pfennigs") also circulated as "invaders". They were referred to as Näpfchenheller ("saucer hellers") in Saxony. The name of the coin comes from 1668 Saxon files.

=== Wechselthaler standard 1670/71 ===
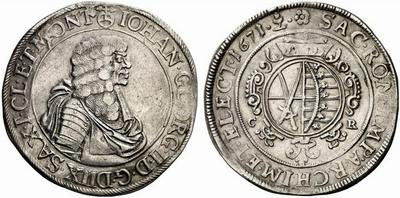
Wechseltaler, 1671 (without inscription WECHSELTHALER), Dresden Mint

In the years 1670/1671 the Wechselthaler and its sub-denominations were minted based on the Wechseltaler standard.

The Wechselthaler was issued under Elector John George II (1656–1680) to the Wechselthaler or Burgundia standard (861/1000 fine). The thaler and its sub-denominations were intended as change (Wechselgeld) to encourage Leipzig trade with Hamburg and the Netherlands. The first coins from 1670 therefore bear the inscription WECSELTHALER on the reverse. The Wechseltaler standard was only valid in Electoral Saxony in 1670 and 1671.

=== Saxon-Polish Bankotalers to Burgundian standard (1702) ===
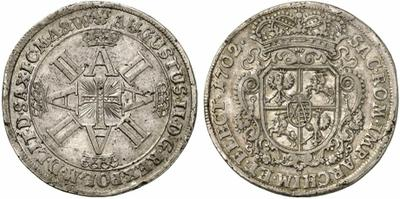
Saxon-Polish Bankotaler of 1702, Leipzig Mint, so-called 'Beichlingscher Ordenstaler'

In 1702, Augustus the Strong (1694–1733) had three different Bankotalers minted at the Leipzig Mint. They corresponded in value to Polish talers minted to the Burgundian standard and were therefore somewhat less valuable than talers minted to the imperial standard. There were lower-value Saxon talers, but also normal Polish talers.

The minting of the Bankotalers was carried out by Great Chancellor (Großkanzler) Wolf Dietrich, Count of Beichlingen. On the so-called Beichling Ordenstaler only the cross of the order was shown, but not the Order of the Elephant, as was the case with the other two talers.

It was assumed that Beichlingen had this cross designed to be that of the Danish Order of the Dannebrog of which he was a knight, and that the taler was therefore an insult to the king. The count, who was also responsible for the minting of the inferior Roter Seufzers of 1701 and 1702, fell out of favour. The minting of all three Bankotalers was discontinued in the year of their issue.

=== Convention standard (1763–1838) ===
The disruption of coinage during the Seven Years' War (1756–1763) urgently required a coin reform. Prussian contributions and the counterfeit coining by Frederick II (1740–1786) as a means of financing the war led to the complete collapse of the monetary system in Saxony and Poland.

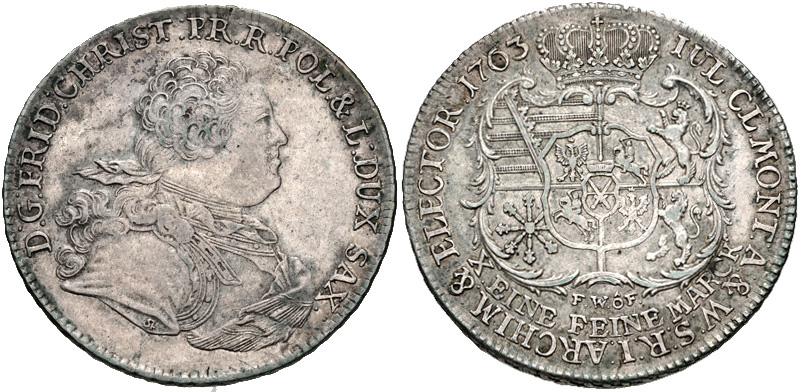
Elector Frederick Christian, Convention Speciestaler 1763, with inscription X EINE FEINE MARCK, Dresden Mint

On 14 May 1763, Electoral Saxony and the Ernestine principalities introduced the Convention standard, also known as the 20-gulden standard. From this fine silver mark of approx. 234 g, the following was minted in Saxony:

- 10 Convention Speciestaler (Conventionsthaler) = 20 2/3 thalers = 40 1/3 thalers = 80 1/6 thalers = 160 1/12 thalers (double groschen) = 320 1/24 thalers (groschen) = 960 1/48 thalers (half groschen).

Calculations were made in Convention currency. 1 thaler (Reichstaler) was a unit of account worth 24 groschen. The Convention coins from the groschen to the Convention Speciestaler remained stable during the entire period of validity of the Convention coin standard.

Ducats, 5 thaler (August d'or) and 10 thaler pieces (double August d'or) were minted as gold coins, primarily for long-distance and wholesale trade. They also remained unchanged in weight and fineness. Other coins were the Heller, Pfennig, 3 Pfennig, 4 Pfennig and 8 Pfennig pieces grouped as country or divisional coins. Both the gold coins and the pfennig coins were not Convention money.

From 1804 to 1825 all the copper minting for Saxony took place in Grünthal Mint, which was located in the "Althammer" ("old hammer mill") of the Grünthal Sawmill and was built as a subsidiary of the Dresden Mint.

=== 14 Thaler standard (1839–1856) ===
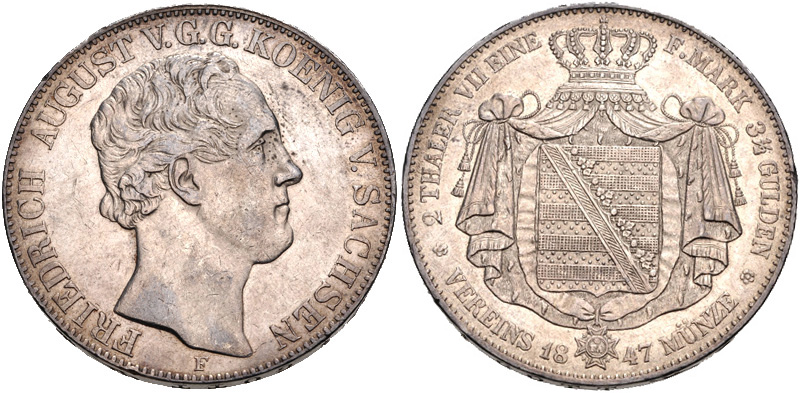
King Frederick Augustus II, double thaler 1847, with inscription 2 THALER VII A F. MARK 3 1/2 GULDEN / VEREINSMÜNZE

After the introduction of the German Trade and Customs Union, the participating states founded the German Customs Union (Deutscher Zollverein) in Munich and Dresden in 1837/38, which adopted the Prussian (Graumann) 14 Thaler standard. After that, standard double thalers or 3 1/2 gulden pieces were minted.

In the Kingdom of Saxony the following was minted from the fine silver mark:

- 7 double thalers = 14 Vereinsthalers ("union thalers")
- 1 Vereinsthaler = 30 Neugroschen ("new groschen") = 300 pfennig
- 1 Neugroschen = 10 pfennigs (1 fine mark = 420 Neugroschen)

The thaler corresponded in value to the Prussian thaler, the Saxon Neugroschen as 1/30 thaler to the Prussian silver groschen also valued at 1/30 thaler. The Saxon and Prussian nominal systems differed in the division of the groschen into pfennigs. While Prussia retained the old duodecimal system with the subdivision into 12 pfennigs, Saxony took a conscious step towards the decimal system with the subdivision of the groschen into 10 pfennigs. This was particularly evident in the 1/3 thaler, which was worth 10 Neugroschen or 100 Saxon pfennigs.

=== 30 Thaler standard (1857–1871) (1872) ===
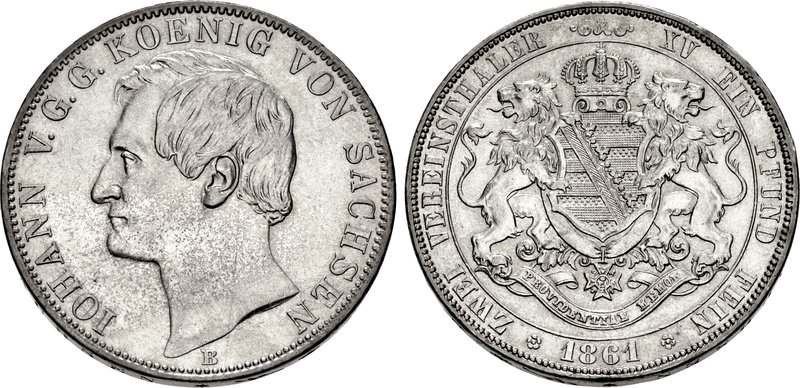
King John, double thaler, 1861, with inscription 2 VEREINSTHALER XV EIN PUND FEIN

In 1857, Austria and Liechtenstein joined the German Coin Union (Münzverein) in Vienna. Decimal currency was introduced with the Vienna Mint Treaty. The Mark was replaced by the customs pound (Zollmund) of 500 g and the thaler was issued as a Vereinsthaler alongside the double thaler. 30 Vereinsthalers were minted from the 500g customs pound. This mint standard was used in Saxony in the Dresden Mint until the introduction of imperial currency.

The founding of the Empire without Austria and Liechtenstein made a single currency possible. The German Reich exercised the right to mint coins on behalf of its federal states. Saxon coin history ended with the issue of the new Mark coins in gold and silver, although in the Saxon kingdom until 1886 in the Dresden mint and then in Muldenhütten near Freiberg a mint was still in operation until 1953. The old thaler to a 14-thaler standard with the Cologne mark as coin base weight, had its value modified only very slightly by the Vienna Mint Treaty to a 30 thaler standard aligned to the customs pound as the coin base weight, corresponded to three marks in the new common currency. The Saxon 1/3 thaler of 100 pfennigs lived on in the newly introduced mark. Saxon pfennigs could thus remain in circulation for many years without any problems at the value of the new pfennigs under the mark.

=== Coins of the Albertine duchies created by division of the land ===
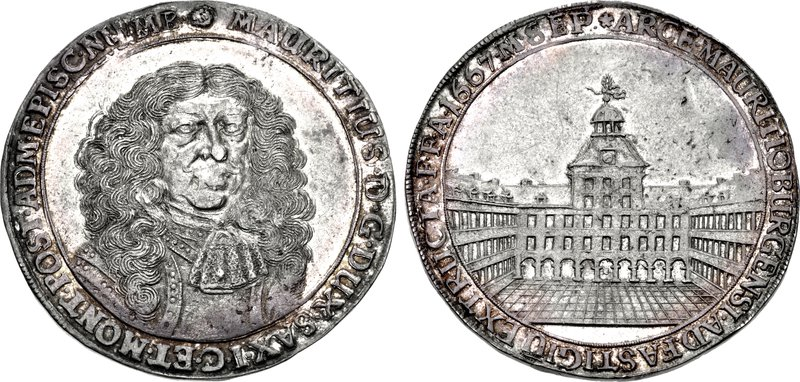
Duke Maurice of Saxe-Zeitz, thaler minted on the construction of Moritzburg Castle in Zeitz, 1667

When Elector John George I died on 8 October 1656 at his residential palace in Dresden, he left behind a will drawn up on 20 July 1652. An important provision therein was the partition of the state among his four sons. According to this, the eldest son succeeded him as Elector John George II; his second son, Duke Augustus, became the progenitor of the Dukes of Saxe-Weissenfels, a line that became extinct in 1746. His third son, Duke Christian, became the progenitor of the dukes of Saxe-Merseburg, which died out in 1738.

The fourth son, Duke Maurice, Administrator of the Naumburg-Zeitz Abbey from 1653, resided in Naumburg from 1653 to 1663, then in Zeitz at the Moritzburg that he had built. He was the founder of the Saxe-Zeitz line. Maurice died on 4 December 1681 in Zeitz. His domain was then ceded to Electoral Saxony in 1717. The last son died in the clergy in 1759.

Coins were minted by the Albertine duchies of Saxe-Weissenfels and Saxe-Zeitz. The best known is the thaler minted on the construction of Moritzburg Castle in Zeitz, which Wilhelm Ernst Tentzel calls a medal (see illustration).

== Literature ==
- Arnold, Paul (1980). "Die sächsische Talerwährung von 1500 bis 1763." In Schweizerische Numismatische Rundschau. Vol. 59, 1980, pp. 50–94, doi:10.5169/seals-174534.
- Arnold, Paul (1986). "Walter Haupt und seine Sächsische Münzkunde". In Numismatische Hefte. No. 20, Dresden, ISSN 0323-6919.
- Arnold, Paul (1996). "Die Genealogie der meißnisch-sächsischen Landesfürsten." In Dresdner numismatische Hefte, No. 1/1996, by the Numismatischer Verein zu Dresden (publ.). ISSN 1613-3447.
- Arnold, Paul, Harald Küthmann, Dirk Steinhilber (1997). Großer deutscher Münzkatalog von 1800 bis heute. Augsburg.
- Blaschke, Karlheinz (1990). Geschichte Sachsens im Mittelalter. Berlin: Unionverlag.
- Buck, Lienhard (1981). Die Münzen des Kurfürstentums Sachsen 1763 bis 1806. Berlin.
- Erbstein, Julius and Albert Erbstein (1888). Erörterungen auf dem Gebiete der sächsischen Münz- und Medaillen-Geschichte bei Verzeichnung der Hofrath Engelhardt'schen Sammlung. Dresden.
- Fengler, Heinz, Gerd Gierow and Willy Unger (1976). transpress Lexikon Numismatik. Berlin.
- Haupt, Walther (1974). Sächsische Münzkunde. Berlin: Deutscher Verlag der Wissenschaften.
- Jaeger, Kurt (1969). Die Münzprägungen der deutschen Staaten vom Ausgang des alten Reiches bis zur Einführung der Reichswährung (Anfang des 19. Jahrhunderts bis 1871/73). Vol. 10: Königreich Sachsen 1806–1873 und Herzogtum Warschau 1810–1815. Basle.
- Kahnt, Helmut (2005) Das große Münzlexikon von A bis Z. Regenstauf.
- Keilitz, Claus (2010). Die sächsischen Münzen 1500–1547. H. Gietl, Regenstauf.
- Klotzsch, Johann Friedrich (1779/1780) Versuch einer Chur-Sächsischen Münzgeschichte. 2 Teile. Johann Christoph Stößel, Chemnitz 1779/1780, urn:urn:nbn:de:gbv:3:1-646198:{{{2}}} (digitalised by the University of Halle).
- Kohl, Christian A. (1994). Talerteilstücke des Kurfürstentums Sachsen. Typenkatalog albertinische Linie 1546–1763. Leipzig.
- Krug, Gerhard (1974). Die meißnisch-sächsischen Groschen 1338–1500. Berlin.
- Lorenz, Rudolf (1968). Die Münzen des Königreichs Sachsen 1806–1871 und des Großherzogtums Warschau 1807–1815. Berlin.
- Nicol, N. D., Marian S. More and Fred J. Borgmann: Standard Catalog of German Coins 1601 to present.
- Suhle, Arthur (1969). Die Münze. Von den Anfängen bis zur europäischen Neuzeit. Leipzig.
- von Schrötter, Friedrich, N. Bauer, K. Regling, A. Suhle, R. Vasmer, J. Wilcke (1970). Wörterbuch der Münzkunde. Berlin (reprint of the original edition of 1930).
- Weber, Tristan (2010). Die sächsische Münzprägung von 1500 bis 1571. H. Gietl, Regenstauf.
- Wieland, Clauß and Helmut Kahnt (2006). Die sächsisch-albertinischen Münzen 1611–1694. Regenstauf.
