= Bartgroschen =

1490s Saxon coin

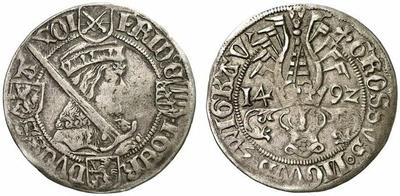
Elector Frederick III the Wise, John and Duke George, Bartgroschen 1492, Mmz. cloverleaf, Zwickau and Schneeberg (Krug 1878)

The Bartgroschen ("beard groschen") was a Saxon coin minted in 1492 and 1493 and embossed with an image of the bearded Duke Frederick III, the Wise (1486–1525). A total of 205,000 pieces were struck at the mints of Zwickau and Schneeberg. The groschen were the first Saxon coins with a portrait of the regent.

== History ==
The groschen coins known as Bartgroschen were initially issued by the Ernestine Elector Frederick III (the Wise) and his brother John the Steadfast. Thereafter, the groschen were jointly issued by Frederick III and his brother John together with the Albertine duke, George the Bearded (1500–1539).

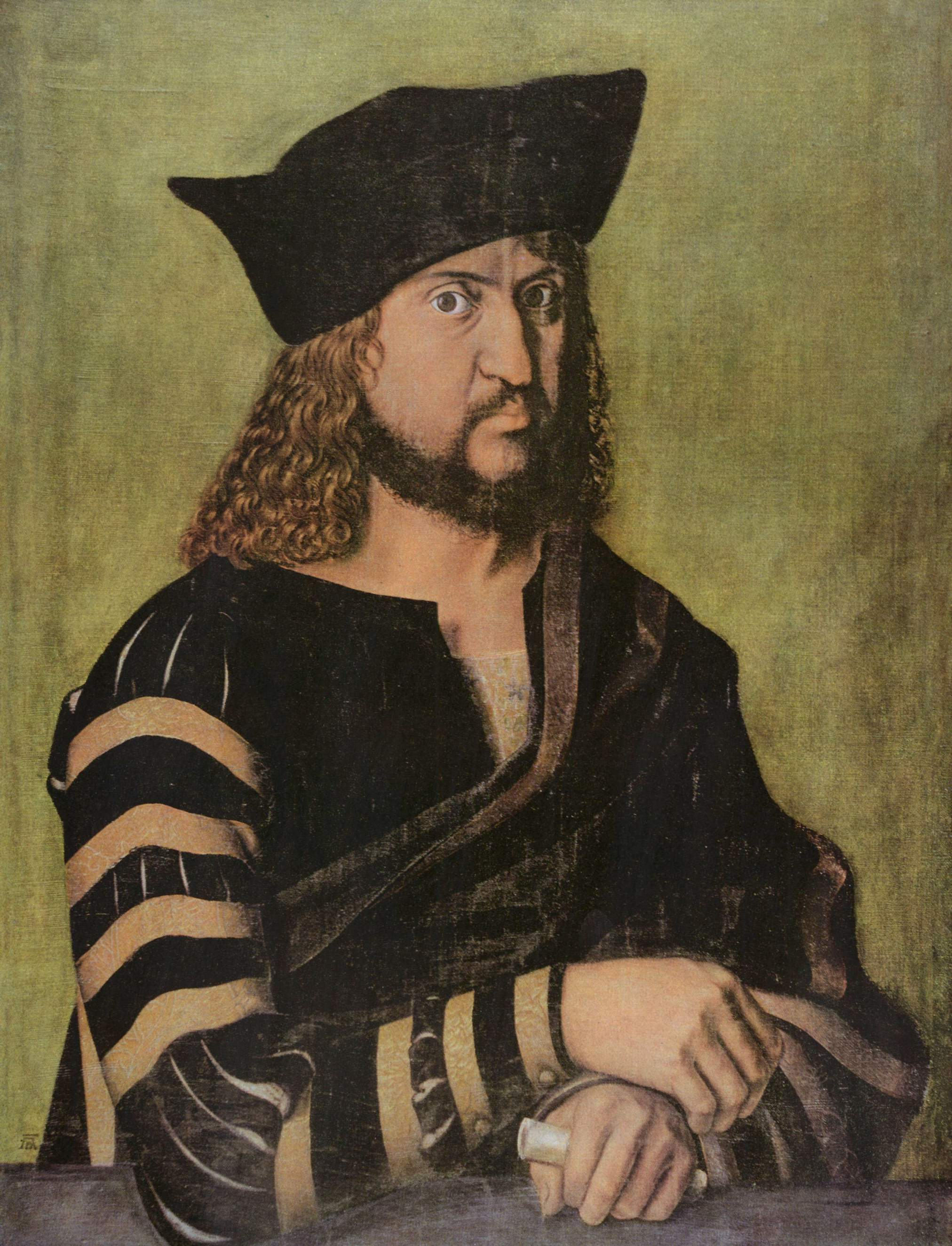
Frederick the Wise

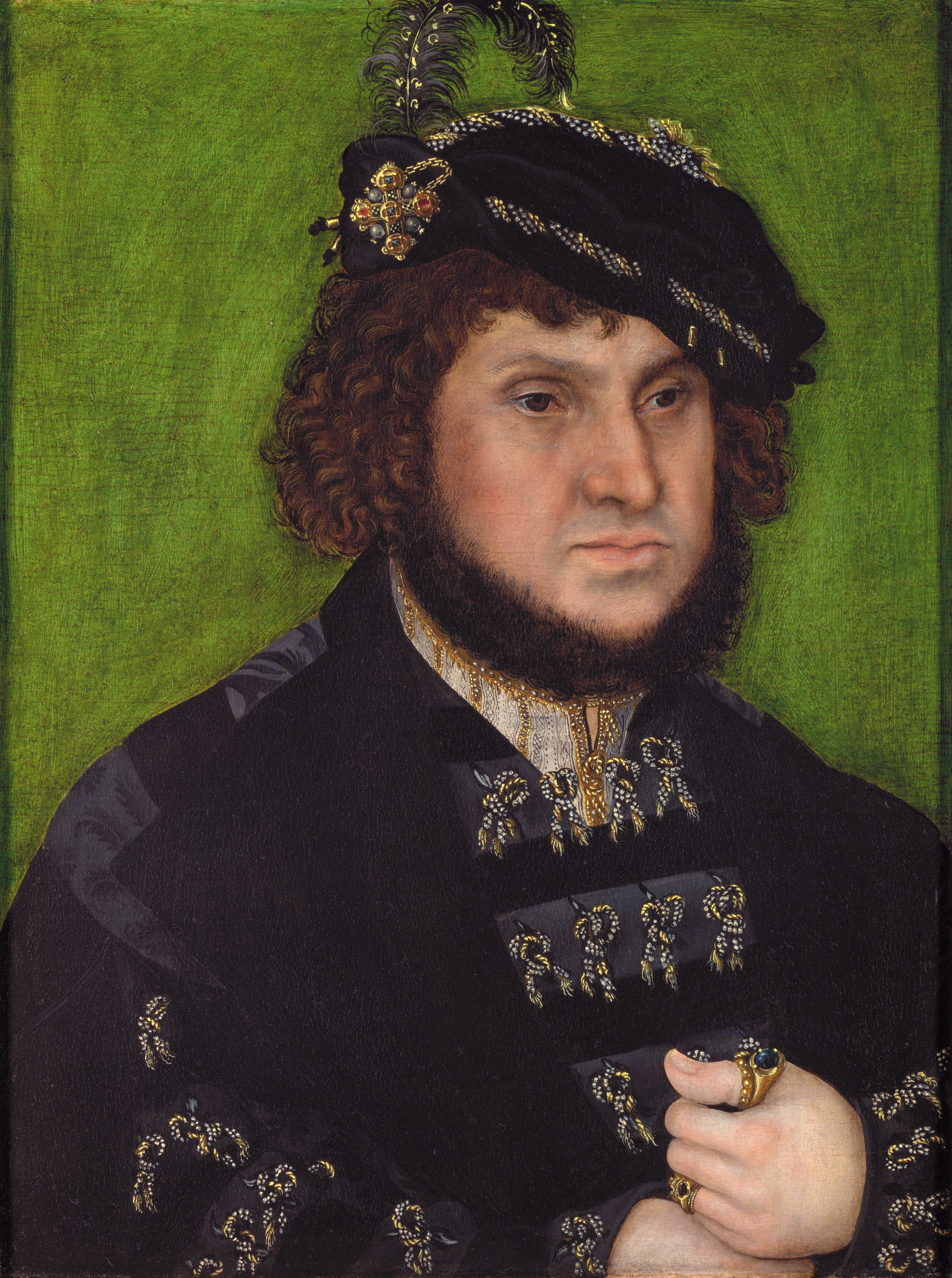
John the Steadfast

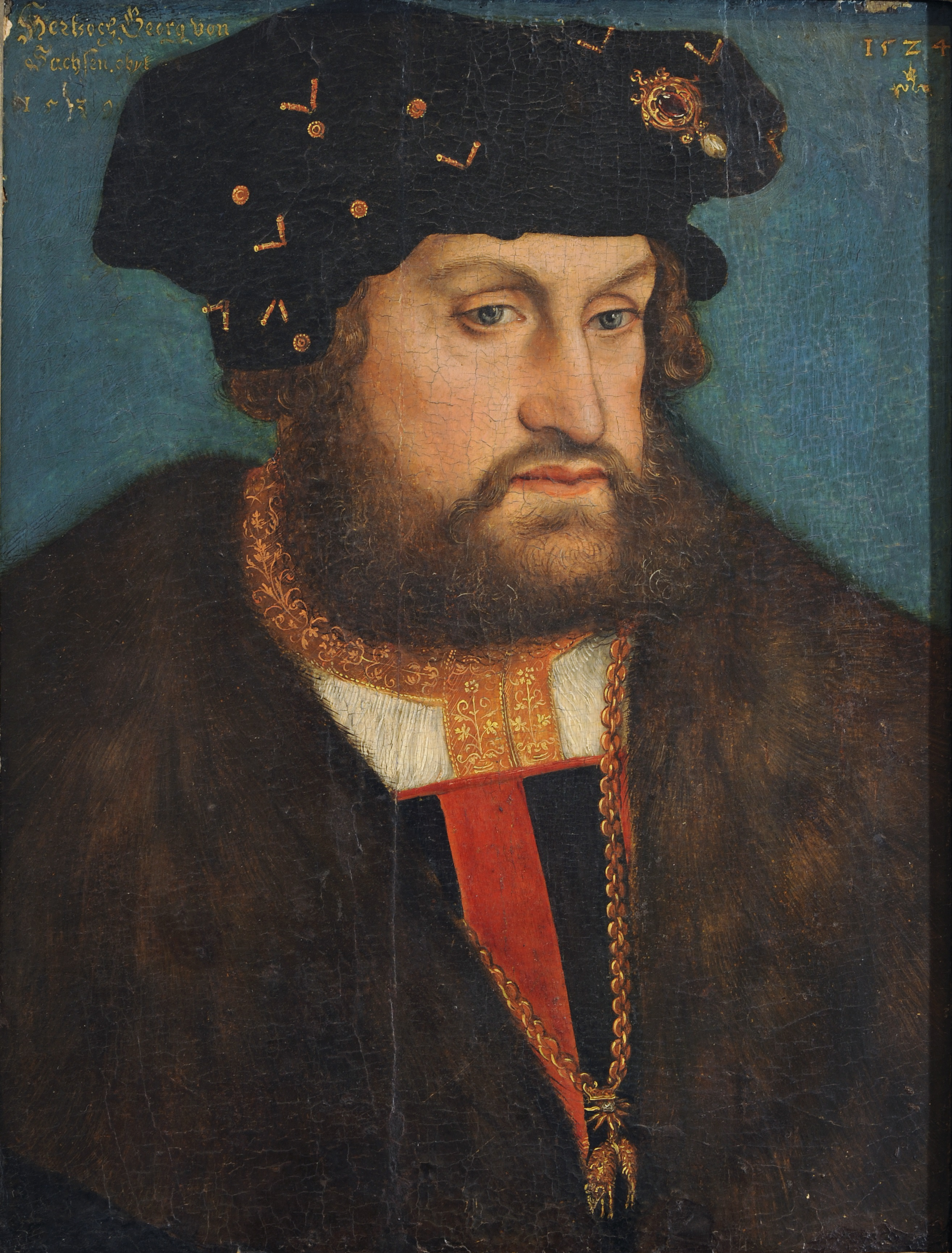
George the Bearded on behalf of Albert the Bold

George, who appears in the inscription of the groschen for Duke Albert the Bold (1464/85–1500), represented his father when he stayed in West Frisia as a result of his military operations. The groschen minted later with the year 1493 are again the sole mintings of the Ernestine family, the Elector and his brother.

The name Bartgroschen was mentioned as early as 1493 in the probation list from the Leipzig Easter market below the Schneeberg. The groschen were therefore not only minted in Zwickau, but also in Schneeberg, despite the coin inscription "ZWIGKAV" or something similar. The minting took place under mintmaster Augustin Horn with his mintmaster mark, the clover leaf. He was mintmaster for the Zwickau, Schneeberg, Langensalza and Colditz mints. He used his mint master's mark in all four mints.

The Bartgroschen of 1492 are the first coins in Saxon coinage history with the portrait of the regent. At the same time, the title elector appears in abbreviated form for the first time. With the closure of the Zwickau Mint in 1493, the minting of these groschen also ended. Not until 1530/1533 during the division of Saxon coinage and then in 1621/1623 in the Kipper and Wipper Period was minting temporarily resumed in Zwickau.

=== Coin values ===
At the coin conference on 13 July 1490 in Oschatz, everyone agreed that the ratio of 20 pennies to one gold guilder was no longer tenable. In the same year, the number of Spitzgroschen per Rhenish guilder was increased from 20 to 21 pieces and the half Schwertgroschen from 40 to 42 pieces (see Meissen guilder). From 1492, the new Bartgroschen were distributed as follows:

- 1 Bartgroschen = 12 pfennigs = 24 heller
- 21 Bartgroschen (27.464 g of fine silver) = 1 Rhenish guilder (2.527 g fine gold)

Ninety Bartgroschen were struck from the eight-lot (= 0.500 f.) Erfurt mark (to 235.4011 g until 1500).

The value ratio of 1:21 between gold guilders and groschen was also maintained when the large silver coins, the silver guilders (thaler), were introduced.

=== Preparations for large silver coinage ===
The preparation for the introduction of the large silver currency began with the coin day in Zeitz in 1490. The first result was the Bartgroschen. For the Rhenish gold gulden it was set at a silver equivalent of 27.464 g, which went eight times into 15-lot (937.5 ‰) mark of fine silver. Based on this base value, ten years later the Wettins minted silver gulden, the first Saxon thaler coins. The enormous silver production of the Ore Mountain mines made it possible to bring the silver currency into a fixed relationship with the gold currency and ultimately to largely replace it.

According to Paul Arnold, the introduction of the large silver currency took about ten years:

"The introduction of large silver currency therefore required well thought-out preparation, which took about ten years. It began on the Zeitz mint day on 9 August 1490, when, in view of the further fall in the gold content of the Rhenish gold gulden and the simultaneous increase in the gold price, the Erfurt mark, the basic coin weight in Saxony, was adjusted to the Cologne mark at 233.855 g. […] The next step was to cover the need for small change. First, the smaller denominations had to be minted in sufficient quantities before the silver gulden (thaler) could be introduced as the keystone of the entire coinage system, so to speak."

The Bartgroschen were worth the same as the Schneeberger Zinsgroschen that were distributed from 1496 onwards. They can therefore often be found under the name "Zinsgroschen".

The Zinsgroschen paved the way for larger silver coins.

== Design and inscription ==
The obverse of the groschen shows the bearded bust of the Elector in ceremonial robes with a sword on his right shoulder. There are four coats of arms in the legend. On the reverse you can see the crowned helmet with the Saxon crest between the separated number representing the year and the cloverleaf of the mintmaster's mark. The coins that are considered rare today are mostly weakly struck.

The medalist of the first silver gulden minted in Annaberg/Frohnau and probably also in Wittenberg in 1500, the so-called Klappmützentaler, was based on the obverse of this coin and also depicted the four coats of arms (Electoral Saxony, Thuringia and Meissen) in the inscription concerned.

The inscription on the sole issue (1492/1493) of the Ernestine duke, Frederick III with his brother John is (possibly also with small deviations - see KRUG):

- Obverse: FRID(ericus).E–L(e)C(tor).IO(hannes):–DVC(e)S:–SAXO(niae)
  - Translation: Frederick, Elector, and John, Dukes of Saxony
- Reverse: GROSSVS.NOVVS.ZWIGKAV(iensis)
  - Translation: New Zwickau Groschen

The inscription on the coin shown here, the joint currency (1492) of Frederick III with his brother John and the Albertine Duke George reads:

- Obverse: FRID(ericus):E(lector)–:I(ohannes).GE(o)R(gius)–DVC(e)S.S–A–XO(n)I(ae)
  - Translation: Frederick, Elector, John and George, Dukes of Saxony
- Reverse: GROSSVS.NOVVS.ZWIGKAV(iensis)
  - Translation: New Zwickau Groschen

== See also ==
- Saxon coinage history

== Bibliography ==
- Walther Haupt: Sächsische Münzkunde, Deutscher Verlag der Wissenschaften, Berlin 1974.
- Gerhard Krug: Die meißnisch-sächsischen Groschen 1338–1500, Deutscher Verlag der Wissenschaften, Berlin 1974.
- Paul Arnold: Die sächsische Talerwährung von 1500 bis 1763, in: Schweizerische numismatische Rundschau, Vol. 59, 1980.
- Tristan Weber: Die sächsische Münzprägung von 1500 bis 1571: Eine quantitative Studie, Edition M & S, Münzen und Sammeln, Regenstauf 2010, ISBN 978-3-86646-827-6.
