= Münzherr =

A Münzherr ("mint lord") is the owner of coin sovereignty within a certain territory and was formerly the person or city with the 'minting regale' (Münzregale) or royal minting rights. Usually this was the king or emperor himself, but also noblemen or clerics who had been granted minting rights from the king, e.g. as part of their fiefdom. In the Late Middle Ages, towns that had freed themselves from their princes also joined the circle of those authorised to mint coins, usually by buying the privilege as a one-off.

Holding the right to mint coins was a very lucrative business, since the seigniorage that the mintmasters had brought considerable profits, especially with the representative coins or Scheidemünzen. For many princes of the Middle Ages and modern times, this was the largest source of income alongside taxes. Since some of them lived a lavish lifestyle and often fought military conflicts, it could even happen that they were alienated from the mint masters employed by them, but also from large merchants such as the Fuggers and the Welsers, had to lend money.

== Literature ==
- Wilhelm Rentzmann: Numismatic Encyclopedia of the Middle Ages and Modern Times. Transpress reprint, Berlin 1980 (unchanged reprint of the edition Berlin 1865)
- Helmut Kahnt, Bernd Knorr: Alte Maße, Münzen und Gewichte. Ein Lexikon. Bibliographisches Institut, Leipzig 1986, Lizenzausgabe Mannheim/Wien/Zürich 1987, ISBN 3-411-02148-9

== See also ==
- Elector Margaretha of Saxony as mint princess (Margarethengroschen)
