= Meissen gulden =

The Meissen gulden (German: Meißnische Gulden, Meißner Gulden or Gulden Meißnisch), abbreviation Mfl., was a Rhenish Gold Gulden that was established in Saxony in 1490 at a value of 21 groschen and which, from 1542 to 1838 became a coin of account (a notional accounting gulden) of the same value.

When the Saxon Guldengroschen (silver gulden, thaler coins), which had had the same value as the gold gulden since 1500, were set at 24 groschen in 1542, the Meissen gulden remained in use in Saxony as an accounting coin at 21 groschen until the 19th century.

== Explanation ==
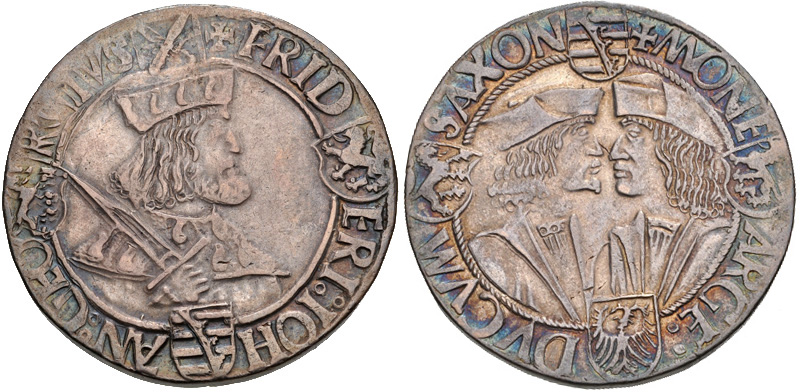
Saxon silver gulden, undated, mintmaster's mark: cross (1512–1523), Annaberg Mint. This gulden corresponded in value to the Rhenish gold gulden and was worth 21 Zinsgroschen. When the later silver gulden were set at 24 groschen, the Rechnungsgulden (coin of account) at 21 groschen was created in addition to the minted gulden.

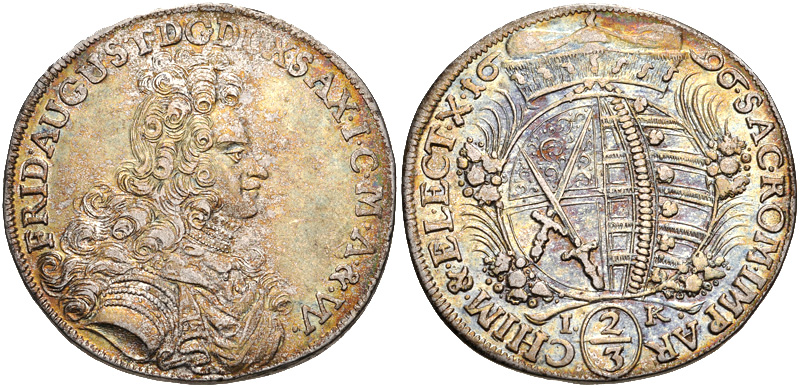
Electoral Saxon Gulden of 1696 (2/3 Kuranttaler), Dresden Mint. A clear distinction must be made between this coined gulden and the notional accounting term "gulden" (Meissen gulden).

The Meissen gulden used as an accounting coin up until the 19th century goes back to the Saxon coinage regulations of 9 August 1490, according to which the gold gulden in Saxony was reduced to 21 groschen (Spitzgroschen) (gold Guldengroschen = 1:21 - see Bartgroschen). /ref>

== See also ==
- Saxon coin history
- Meissen groschen

== Literature ==
- Walther Haupt: Sächsische Münzkunde, Deutscher Verlag der Wissenschaft, Berlin 1974
- Lienhard Buck: Die Münzen des Kurfürstentums Sachsen 1763 bis 1806, Berlin 1981
- Gerhard Krug: Die meißnisch-sächsischen Groschen 1338–1500, Berlin 1974
- Paul Arnold: Die sächsische Talerwährung von 1500 bis 1763, Schweizerische numismatische Rundschau, Vol. 59, 1980
- Friedrich von Schrötter (ed.) mit N. Bauer, K. Regling, A. Suhle, R. Vasmer, J. Wilcke: Wörterbuch der Münzkunde, de Gruyter, Berlin 1970 (reprint of the original edn. of 1930)
- Heinz Fengler, Gerd Gierow, Willy Unger: transpress Lexikon Numismatik, Berlin 1976
- Helmut Kahnt: Das große Münzlexikon von A bis Z, Regenstauf 2005
