= Schildgroschen (Hesse) =

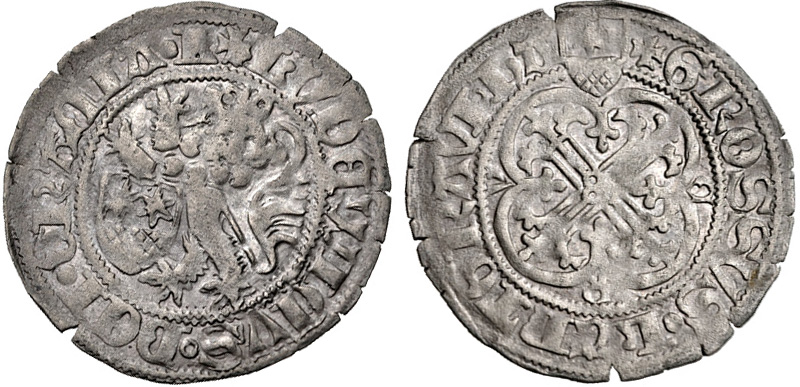
Hessian Schildgroschen (Zweischildgroschen) Louis the Frank (1458–1471), based on the Meissen Pfahlschildgroschen. (silver; 2,03 g; diameter 28 mm)

The Hessian Schildgroschen (Hessische Schildgroschen) was a coin of the groschen type, based on the Meissen-Saxon Schildgroschen, one of the late medieval, Groschen period coins that was very similar to the Meissen Schildgroschen. It was also called the Kronichte Groschen ("crowned groschen") and Zweischildgroschen ("double Schildgroschen").

== History ==
Louis the Peaceful of Hesse (1413–1458), brother-in-law of Saxon Elector Frederick the Gentle (1428–1464), as the first Landgrave of Hesse had the Schildgroschen minted with the Hessian lion based on the model of the Meissen Schildgroschen. Louis joined the Saxon coin reform in November 1436 and also had high-quality groschen minted that were valued at 20 to the Rhenish gulden. The large lion shield on his first groschen corresponds to the Schildiger Groschen of Frederick the Meek with the difference that a small crown can be seen above the large shield. The Schildgroschens minted from 1436 are therefore also called Kronichte groschen ("crowned groschen"). Subsequent crown groschen were coined by Louis I with crowns in the coin design, arranged in a quatrefoil around the lion's shield.

The Schildgroschen of Louis the Frank (1458–1471), also known as the Zweischildgroschen (two-shield groschen), were minted based on the Meissen Pfahlschildgroschen.

== Bibliography ==
- Fengler, Heinz, Gerd Gierow and Willy Unger (1976). transpress Lexikon Numismatik (1976).
- Krug, Gerhard (1974). Die meißnisch-sächsischen Groschen 1338–1500.
- von Schrötter, Friedrich (1970). Wörterbuch der Münzkunde, reprint of the 1930 original edn.
