= Kapszczyzna =

Tax in the Grand Duchy of Lithuania

Kapszczyzna (Belarusian: Капщызна, Ukrainian: Капщизна) was a tax in the Grand Duchy of Lithuania on distilling or selling alcoholic drinks, a type of the excise tax on alcohol. In Polish lands of the Polish-Lithuanian Commonwealth the corresponding tax was called czopowe.

By one suggestion, the term is a variation of the Polish term kopczyzna, a different kind of tax, under the influence of the Belarusian language feature of akanye (o->a phonemic shift). Kapszszczyzna itself is derived from the monetary unit Kopa. By another suggestion it is derived from Latin capagium (a kind of monetary subsidy (pecuniarium subsidium)).

This tax was collected annually before Christmas and directed to the state treasury. Its amount was uniform over the state.
