= Meissen groschen =

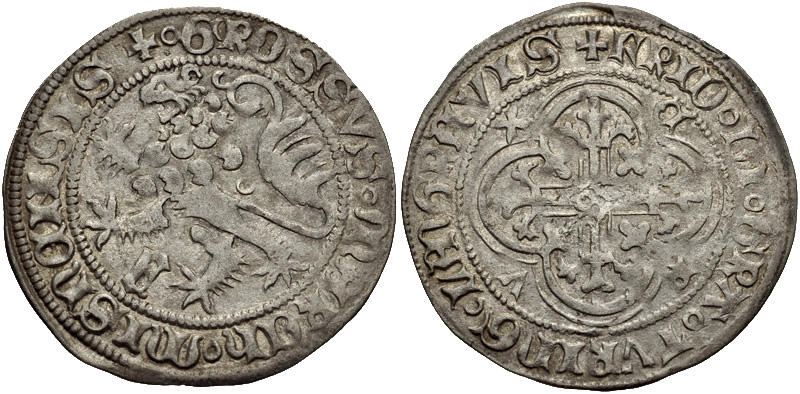
Groschen of the Margraviate of Meissen, Reverse: Meissen lion rampant facing left with a simple tail, Latin inscription: GROSSUS MARCHIONNIS MISNENISIS ("Groschen of the March of Meissen") Obverse:cross fleury with quatrefoil, Latin inscription: abbreviated title of the mint lords: DEI GRATIA THURINGIAE LANDGRAVI (By the Grace of God Landgrave of Thuringia)

The Meissen groschen (Meißner Groschen) or broad groschen (Breite Groschen) was a Meissen-Saxon silver coin of the 14th and 15th centuries and the regional currency of the Margraviate of Meissen in the Late Middle Ages. It was introduced by Margrave Frederick II of Meissen in 1338/39 and modelled on the Prague groschen.

== Distribution ==
The Margraves of Meissen had large silver deposits in the Ore Mountains. In the first hundred years, they had the Meissen groschen struck exclusively in Freiberg. The Freiberg Mint coined a total of 301,298 Mark (about 70.5 tons) of fine silver. Since a lot of silver could be minted, the Meissen groschen was not only used in the Margraviate of Meissen, but also spread beyond the borders of the actual area where it was legal tender. Like the Prague groschen, it was often imitated and countermarked.

== Description ==
The Meissen groschen was minted in the Freiberg and Zwickau mints. Until 1405, the obverse always depicted the Meissen lion rampart looking left with a simple tail and the Latin inscription: GROSSUS MARCHIONNIS MISNENISIS ("Groschen of the March of Meissen"). On the reverse were a cross fleury, a quatrefoil and the abbreviated title of the mint lords in Latin: DEI GRATIA THURINGIAE LANDGRAVI (By the Grace of God Landgrave of Thuringia). Beginning in 1457, the year dates were often included in an interrupted manner (in the series 1465–1469 and 1490–1499).

== Types ==
Thousands of types of Meissen groschen were minted. The variants include:

- Fürstengroschen ("prince's groschen")
- Helmgroschen ("helment groschen")
- Horngroschen ("horn groschen")
- Judenkopfgroschen ("Jew's head groschen")
- Kreuzgroschen ("cross groschen")
- Löwengroschen ("lion groschen")
- Schildgroschen ("shield groschen")
- Schwertgroschen ("sword groschen")

== Debasement ==
The monetary value of the Meissen-Saxon silver pfennig decreased over time (cf. Gresham-Copernican law). In 1338, a fine Prague coin mark (approx. 253.14 g) became 14 2/9 lots of silver (= 888/1000 fine) 66 2/3 groschen with a gross weight of 3.797 g and a fine weight of 3.375 g. By 1360, the fineness was reduced so much that from the same amount of silver, 70 groschen - now with a fine weight of 2.788 g – could be minted. Then, in 1432, 525 groschen were minted from a fine Prague mint mark; now the individual coins only had a fine weight of 0.48 g silver.

== Alignment to the Rhenish guilder ==
The currency alignment of the Meissen groschen to the Rhenish guilder as the basis for the regional groschen currency of the Margraviate of Meissen took place from 1368 to 1369. During this time, groschen of the 'broad groschen' type were minted in the State Mint of Freiberg and the Zwickau Mint. From the middle of the 15th century a fixed exchange rate was established between the Meissen Groschen and Rhenish Gulden. Initially minted with a ration of 1/20 or 1/21 with the Rhenish guilder, this coin, designated as external currency (Oberwähr) was accepted for all payments in the Margraviate of Meissen. Later, the Meissen groschen was minted with a ratio of 1/26 to the gold guilder and referred to as internal currency (Beiwähr).

== See also ==
- Meissen guilder

== Literature ==
- G. Krug: Die meißnisch-sächsischen Groschen 1338 bis 1500. Veröffentlichungen des Museums für Vorgeschichte Dresden 13, Berlin 1974.
- Heinz Fengler, Gerhard Gierow, Willy Unger: Transpress Lexikon Numisatik. Berlin 1976.
- Paul Arnold: ührer durch die ständige Ausstellung des Münzkabinetts.2nd expanded and improved edn. 1978, Staatliche Kunstsammlungen Dresden (ed.).
