= Kopa (number) =

Medieval unit of measurement that denotes 60 pieces

Kopa (Belarusian: капа́, Latin: sexagena, Lithuanian: kapa, Polish: kopa, Czech: kopa, Ukrainian: копа́) was a medieval unit of measurement used in Central and Eastern Europe, particularly in the 15–18th-century Grand Duchy of Lithuania and Polish–Lithuanian Commonwealth. It denoted 60 pieces or 5 dozens of whatever was counted. It was used for counting large amounts of money (particularly Prague groschens). For example, ransoms and war reparations after the Battle of Grunwald were counted in kopas of Prague groschen; the 16th-century treasury of the Grand Duchy was counted in kopas of Lithuanian groschens. Kopa was also used to count grain sheaves or quantities of other products (for example, nails, eggs, cabbages).

Kopa's original meaning was the number of Prague groschens that could be minted from a grzywna of silver. In the Grand Duchy of Lithuania that number was 60. In Poland, during the reign of Casimir the Great (1333–1370), the weight of grzywna was reduced by about 20%. That meant that in Poland kopa was equal to 48. In the 15th century, Poland adopted the Lithuanian definition that a kopa is equal to 60. Germans had a similar unit, the Schock, to count Meissen groschen minted by Frederick II, Elector of Saxony and William III, Landgrave of Thuringia. The unit was officially abolished by the Russian Empire in 1825, but survived in everyday use until the early 20th century.

The term is often incorrectly applied to Lithuanian long coins as earlier researchers believed that the word kopa was derived from Lithuanian kapoti (to chop). However, that is likely an example of folk etymology. The actual etymology is not fully understood.

== See also ==
- Gross (unit) – unit for larger multiples of twelve
