= Münzwardein =

Historical official in Germany

In medieval and Renaissance Germany, the Münzwardein ('assayer', lit. 'mint-warden') was the title of an official whose duties included supervising the Münzmeister and the stock of precious metals used in minting. He was responsible for the quality of alloys and the accuracy of weights and measures.

The Münzwardein was commissioned by the highest authority (generally a prince or a bishop). He was therefore the official representative of his principal in discharging his duty as an inspector of precious metals and precious metal goods in trade. It was his duty to produce weights used in minting and often he would also be charged with the safekeeping of minting irons when they were not used in producing specie.

Wardein (or Guardein) is a loan from Old North French wardien, Dutch wardijn, adopted around 1400 in the Rhineland, as English warden ultimately from Frankish *warding-. The Romance and Low German term (as the Middle French eswardein) can refer to any type of supervisor, besides a money assayer specifically one who supervises the quality of cloth or of grain, but in High German, the term is narrowed to the field of metallurgical assay, in the 15th century of money assayers, and in the 16th and 17th centuries also of officials who tested the quality of metal ores in mining.

== Bibliography ==
- Grimm, Deutsches Wörterbuch.

== See also ==
- Warden of the Mint
- Münzmeister
- Assay office
