= Swiss Numismatic Society =

Swiss numismatic organization founded in 1879

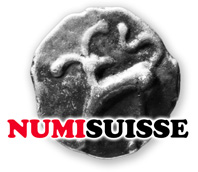
- SNG logo
- Formation: 1879
- Headquarters: Zurich and Bern, Switzerland
- President: Hortensia von Roten
- Website: https://numisuisse.ch/

The Swiss Numismatic Society (SNG; German: Schweizerische Numismatische Gesellschaft; SSN; French: Société suisse de numismatique) was founded in 1879 and is a registered non-profit organization. It is the overall Swiss association of individuals and institutions with an interest in ancient and modern numismatics.

SNG is a learned society and promotes research into all branches of numismatics. Foremost researchers and collectors, both professional and amateur, in the field of numismatics are amongst the members of the Society.

== Journals ==
The SNG publishes two journals, the annual Swiss Numismatic Review and the quarterly Swiss Numismatic Gazette, with scholarly articles in four languages (English/German/French/Italian).

== Monographic series ==
The SNG also published:

- E. Tobler, B. Zäch, S. Nussbaum, "Die Münzprägung der Stadt St. Gallen 1407 bis 1797", 2008.
- S. Hurter, "Die Didrachmenprägung von Segesta", 2008.
- G.K. Jenkins, "Coins of Punic Sicily", 1997.
- M. Price, "The Coinage in the Name of Alexander the Great and Philip Arrhidaeus", 1991.
- L. Mildenberg, "The Coinage of the Bar Kokhba War", 1984.
- B. Deppert-Lippitz, "Untersuchungen zur Münzprägung Milets vom vierten bis ersten Jahrhundert v.Chr.", 1984.
- B. Schulte, "Die Goldprägung der gallischen Kaiser von Postumus bis Tetricus", 1983.
- A. Furtwängler, "Monnaies grecques en Gaule: Le trésor d'Auriol et le monnayage de Massalia, 535/520-450 av. J.-C.", 1978.
- P. Felder, "Medailleur Johann Carl Hedlinger (1691–1771)", 1978.
- B. Simonetta, "The Coins of the Cappadocian Kings", 1977.
- L. Weidauer, "Probleme der frühen Elektronprägung", 1975.
- H.-U. Geiger, "Der Beginn der Gold- und Dickmünzenprägung in Bern", 1968.
