= Dreier (coin) =

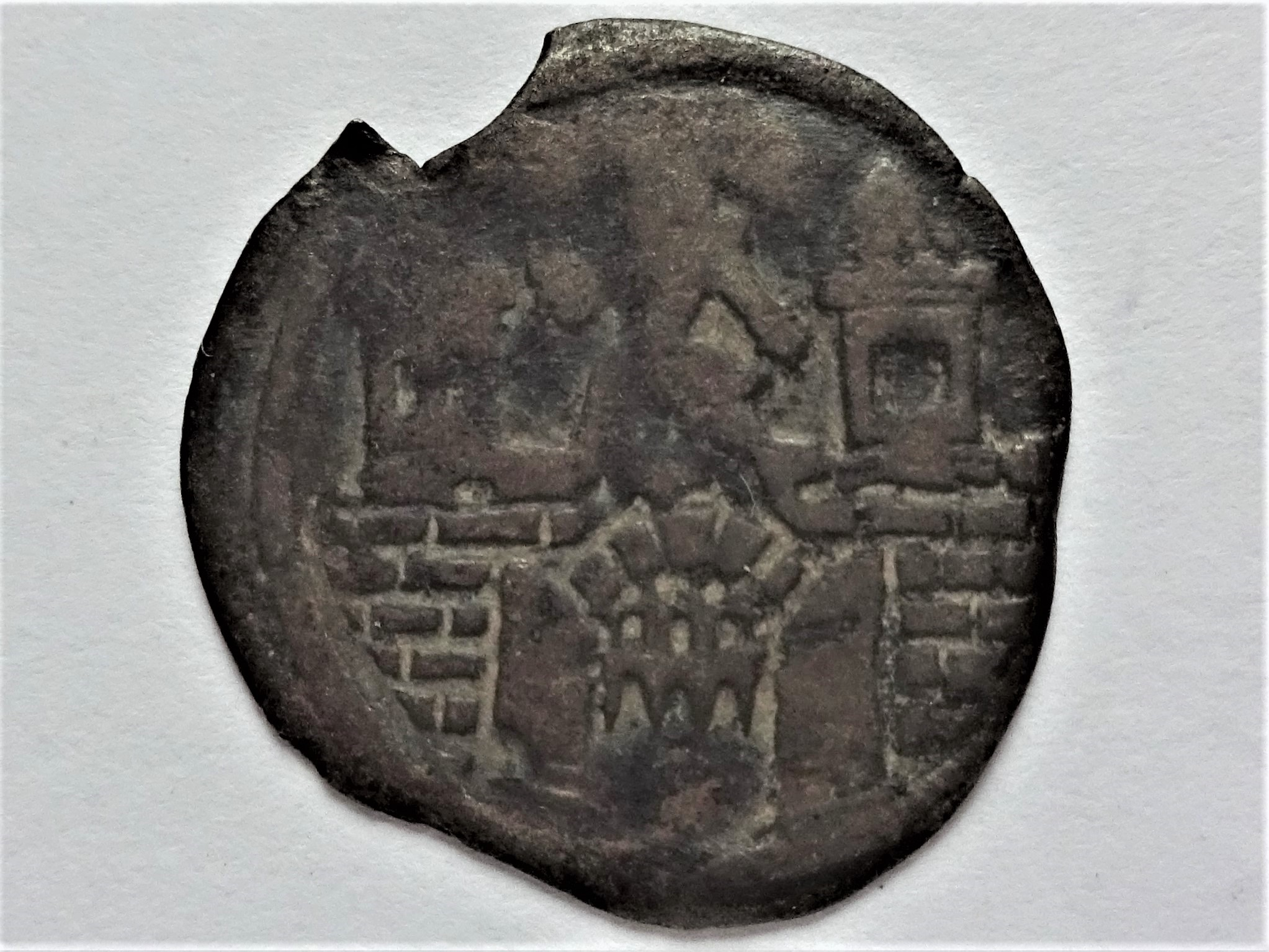
1622 Magdeburg Dreier

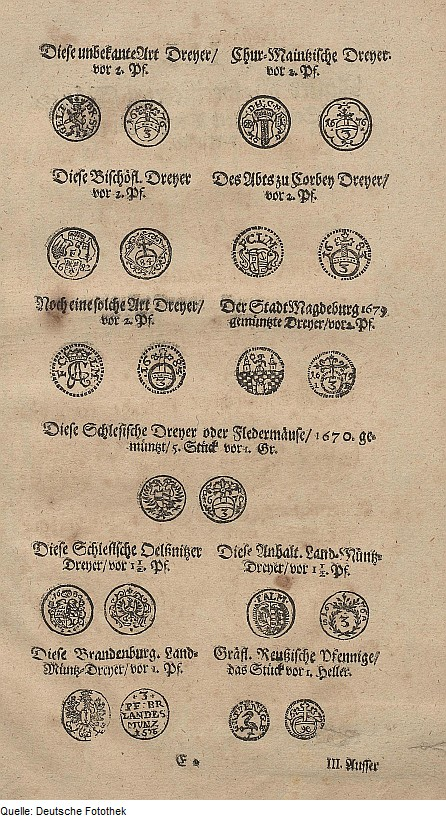
Illustrations of different Dreier or Dreyer coins

The Dreipfenniggröschlein, commonly called the Dreier or Dreyer, was a coin initially minted in the Electorate of Saxony from the 16th century. The Saxon coins referred to as Dreiers were initially minted according to the coinage regulations of Duke George the Bearded from 1534 and were thus initially part of Saxon coinage history. Four Dreiers were equivalent to 3 Zinsgroschen. The coins were initially made of silver or the silver/copper alloy, billon.

The coins, which were stamped with the number "3" and were later only made of copper, spread as a means of payment in other states throughout Central and Northern Germany up to the 19th century, including the Kingdom of Prussia and the Duchy of Brunswick where they were known as Dreipfennigstücke (three pfennig pieces). But also in other European countries the Dreier was a common small coin.

== See also ==
- Dreiling - a coin of the HRE worth 3 pfennigs
