= Schock (coin) =

The schock was a historical coin of account in the Kingdom of Saxony as well as in Bohemia and Silesia.

In the Kingdom of Saxony, a distinction was made, based on the old use of the word, whereby 1 schock = 60 units:

- 1 old shock = 60 small schockgroschen = 20 good groschen, it corresponded to 5/4 of a Convention guilders = 75 kreuzer;
- 1 new or heavy schock = 60 good groschen = 3 old schocks, worth 15/4 of a Convention gulden = 225 kreuzers.

There were also different units of currency called the schock in Bohemia and Silesia (Czech kopa):

- 1 old Bohemian schock = 60 Böhmen, worth 3/2 Speciesthaler = 3 Convention guilders = 180 kreuzers;
- 1 new or small Bohemian schock = 40 Böhmen = 2/3 old bohemian schocks, whereby 1 Speciesthaler = 2 Convention guilders = 60 double kreuzers;
- 1 schock Gröschel = 60 Gröschel = 1/4 old Bohemian schocks, corresponding to 3/4 Convention guilders = 45 kreuzers = 180 pfennigs.

A Böhmen (lit.: "Bohemia") was the name of the groschen in Prague and Bohemia; a Gröschel was also called a Fledermaus ("bat").

== Literature ==
- Johann Friedrich Krüger: Vollständiges Handbuch der Münzen, Maße und Gewichte aller Länder der Erde. Gottfried Basse, Quedlinburg/Leipzig 1830, p. 94.
- Johann Jacob Ebert: Unterweisung in den philosophischen und mathematischen Wissenschaften: für die obern Classen der Schulen und Gymnasien. Christian Gottlieb Hertel, Leipzig 1779, p. 227.
