= Ausbeutethaler =

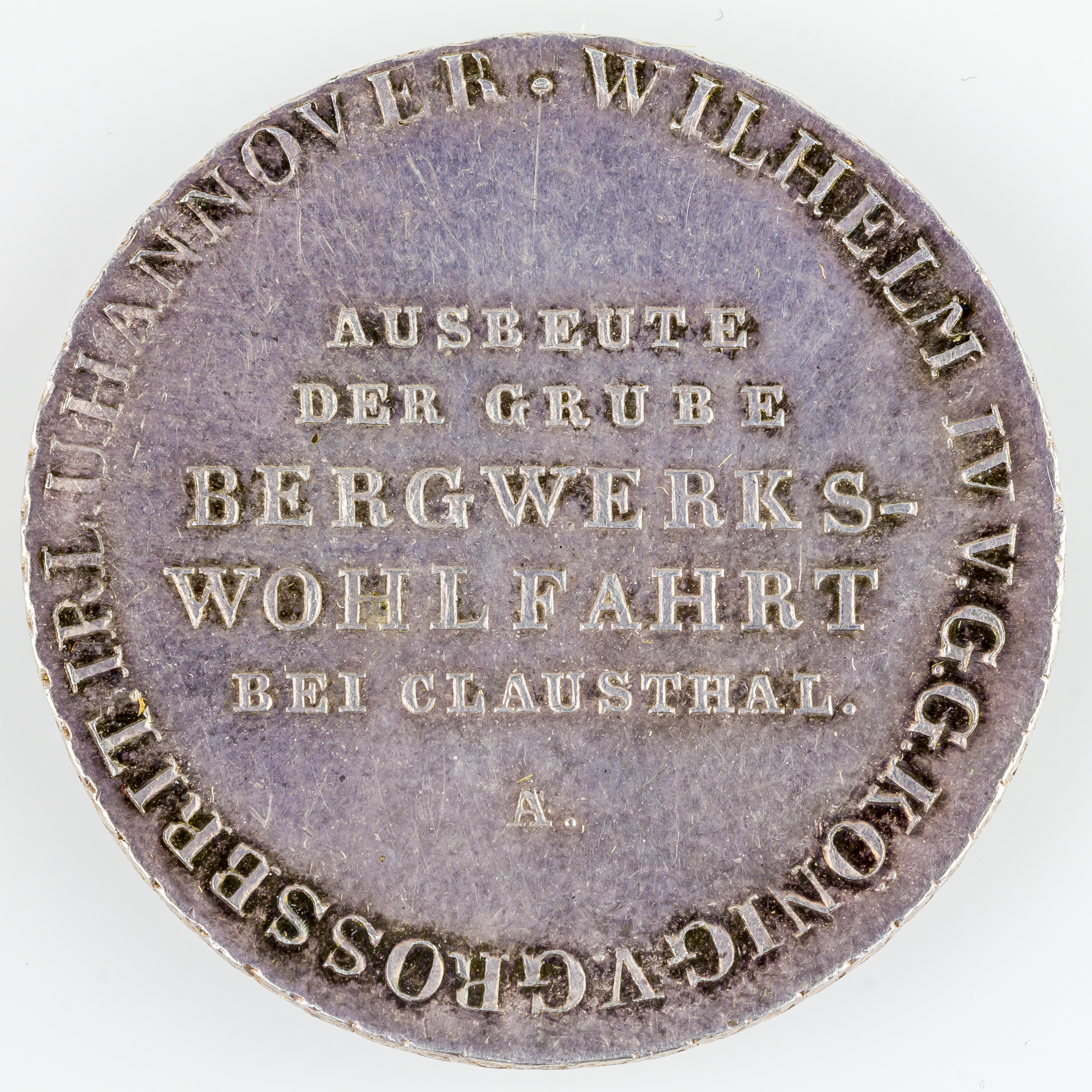
2/3 Thaler of the Bergwerkswohlfahrt Pit at Clausthal, Kingdom of Hanover, William IV 1833

An Ausbeutemünze (pron. "ows-boy-ter-moonzer") lit. "salvage coin"), also often called an Ausbeutethaler because it was so common, is an historical European coin minted from metal extracted from the ore of a particular mine. By far the most common of such coins were made of silver.

These coins were normal legal tender, but differed from the usual circulation coins because they had special images stamped on them and were often circulated at certain anniversaries. They were made by mines, for example, in the Harz Mountains.

== Variants ==
Not only were Thalers made in this fashion, but also part-Thalers, Ducats Lösers and other coins.
