= Minting rights =

Right to mint and issue coins

From the Middle Ages to the Early modern period (or even later), to have minting rights was to have "the power to mint coins and to control currency within one's own dominion."

== History ==
In the Middle Ages there were at times a large number of mints, and similar coins could have different denominations depending on who minted them, but there were certain coinage regulations.

In the Holy Roman Empire, the right to mint coins, known as the Münzrecht, was granted by the emperor to individual feudal princes and cities. As in the Francia under Charlemagne, the empire initially minted coins itself but, from the 10th century, more and more fiefdoms and institutions were granted the right to mint coins. For example, Emperor Otto I gave minting rights to the Archbishopric of Cologne. In the 16th century, the Empire stopped minting coins itself and only specified minting regulations.

Similarly, within European kingdoms, the king granted the right to mint coins.

Individual monasteries of supraregional importance were granted the right to mint coins by the Pope, such as the Cluny Abbey in 1058.

A special event in Saxon coin history was the establishment of a separate mint by Elector Frederick II in Colditz for his wife and the granting of the minting rights to her. As compensation for the high life estate promised to her as the Archduchess of Austria, she was granted the seigniorage: i.e. a certain share in it from the Colditz Mint. The looming future difficulties (see Schwertgroschen) may have prompted the Elector to ask the Emperor Frederick III to ensure his wife received the right to mint coins in Colditz in the name of his two sons until the end of their lives.

== See also ==
- Right of coinage in the Holy Roman Empire
- Jura regalia

== Literature ==
- Gerhard Krug: Die meißnisch-sächsischen Groschen 1338–1500 (1974)
