= Schweizerische Numismatische Rundschau =

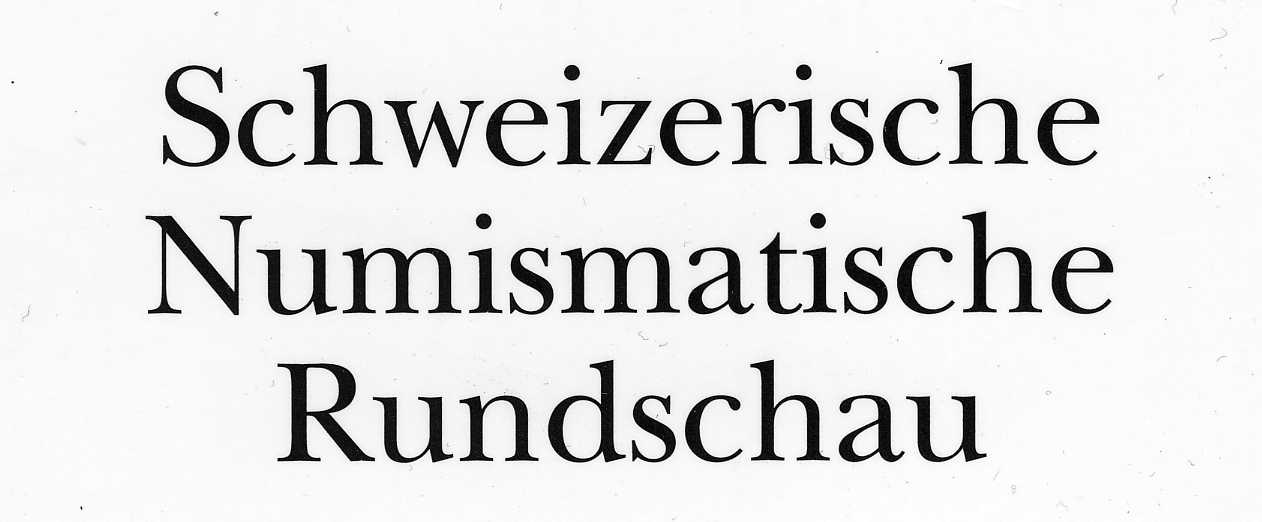
- Discipline: Numismatics
- Language: English / German / French / Italian
- Edited by: Julia Genechesi, Christian Schinzel

Publication details
- History: 1891–present
- Publisher: Swiss Numismatic Society (Switzerland)
- Frequency: Annually
- Open access: Delayed

Standard abbreviations
- ISO 4: Schweiz. Numis. Rundsch.

Indexing
- ISSN: 0035-4163 (print); 2624-8204 (web)

The Schweizerische Numismatische Rundschau (translation: Swiss Numismatic Review) is one of the two peer-reviewed multilingual journals of the Swiss Numismatic Society. Containing articles of the highest scientific level in the field of international numismatics and economic history from antiquity to modern times, the SNR is also known as a main publication for Swiss numismatics.

== Editorial Board ==
- Michael Alram, Vienna
- Michel Amandry, Paris
- Wolfgang Fischer-Bossert, Vienna
- Hans-Ulrich Geiger, Zurich
- Lutz Ilisch, Tübingen
- Ulrich Klein, Stuttgart
- Denis Knoepfler, Neuchâtel
- William E. Metcalf, Connecticut
- Markus Peter, Augst
- Samuele Ranucci, Perugia
- Lucia Travaini, Milan
