= Mintmaster mark =

Mmz.: acorn on a stem

Mintmaster marks (German: Münzmeisterzeichen, abbreviation Mmz.) are often the initials of the mintmaster of a mint or small symbols (cross, star, coat of arms, heraldic device, etc.) for example at the size of the letters on a coin inscription to denote the coins made under his direction. With his mark, the mintmaster assumed responsibility for ensuing the coins issued by his mint were in accordance with the regulations. Mintmaster marks were used as early as the time of bracteate coinage in the Holy Roman Empire, but these can only rarely be deciphered. All mintmaster marks since the beginning of the minting of Thalers have been identified.

The picture on the right shows the mintmaster's mark, an acorn on a stem, of the Dresden mintmaster, Constantin Rothe, on a Reichstaler issued under Duke John George II of Saxony from the year 1662.

== Variants ==
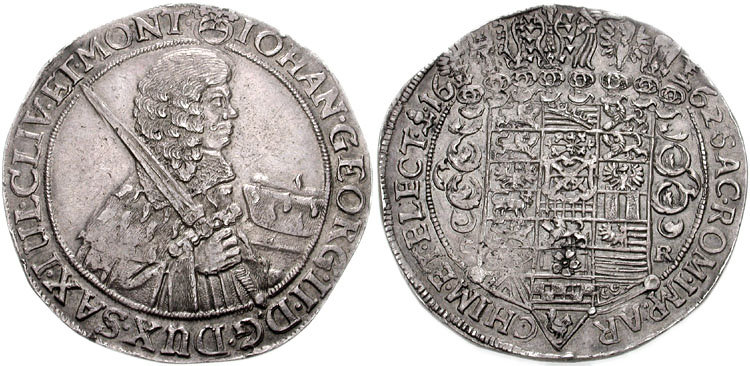
Erbland thaler (Broad thaler) John George II, 1662, mmz. C–R and acorn, mintmaster Constantin Rothe, Dresden Mint

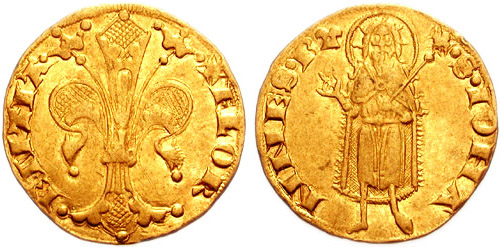
1347 florin with coat of arms and issue mark

Sometimes there are pictographs and letters on a coin. In this case, the pictorial symbol is usually found in the circumscription of the coin and the letters are divided in the field on both sides of the coin's crest. Mintmasters often used their coats of arms as mintmaster symbols. For example, in the Electorate of Saxony:

- Constantin Rothe, mintmaster from 1640 to 1678 in Dresden, put the letters C-R on his coins and also the acorn on a stem from his family coat of arms.
- Andreas Alnpeck, the last mintmaster of the Freiberg Mint, used a six-pointed star from 1546 to 1555 and from 1554 to 1555 also the eagle's head from his coat of arms as the mintmaster's mark.
- Ernst Peter Hecht, mintmaster 1693–1714 in Leipzig, used the letters E P H as the mintmaster's mark and also the pike from his coat of arms.

In Brandenburg:

- Paul Mühlrad, mintmaster 1538–1542 in Berlin put a mill wheel on his coinage.

In Mecklenburg:

- Johann Hund (1512–1526) used a dog as his canting arms and subsidiary image in the corners of the cross on the Rostock schillings.

In Florence:

- Alongside the marks of issue, mintmasters also set their coats of arms on Florentine gold coins.

== Introduction and demise of mintmaster marks ==
Mintmaster marks appear from the late Middle Ages. They were largely superseded in the second half of the 19th century by mint marks in the form of a letter to designate the mint. France (Paris Mint) first replaced mintmaster marks with mint marks to designate the mint as early as the 16th century. The Berlin Mint has used the A mint mark since the middle of the 18th century.

== Mintmaster mark, mint mark, signature ==
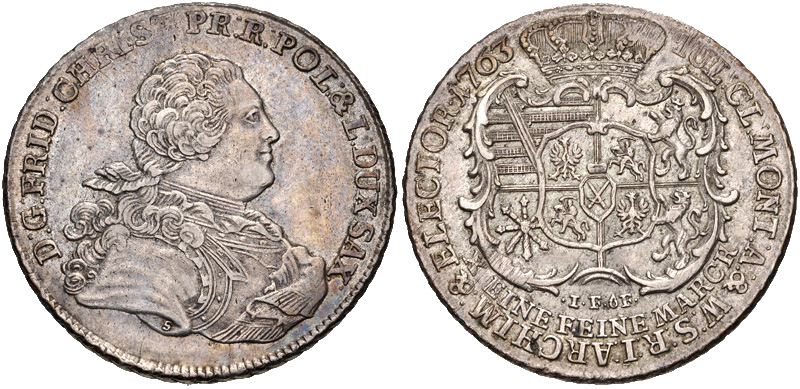
Speciesthaler 1763, mmz. I F ô F, mintmaster Johann Friedrich ô Feral, Leipzig Mint. On the arm section Signum S, medallist: Johann Friedrich Stieler

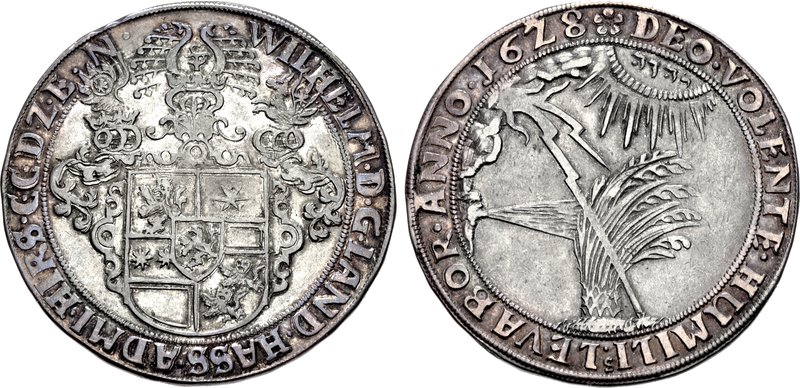
Hesse-Cassel, Weidenbaumthaler of 1628, Mmz.: TS as a monogram between the horns of the landgrave's helmet

Occasionally, the signature of the coin engraver or just the artist's signature is also found on coins. For example, on the Speciesthaler of 1763 is the Mmz. I F ô F of the mintmaster, Johann Friedrich ô Feral of the Leipzig Mint, and on the arm section the Signum S of medallist Johann Friedrich Stieler.

The mintmaster mark should therefore not be confused with the coin signature (Signum).

There is also a risk of confusion with mint marks used to designate the mint if the mintmaster mark consists of only one letter.

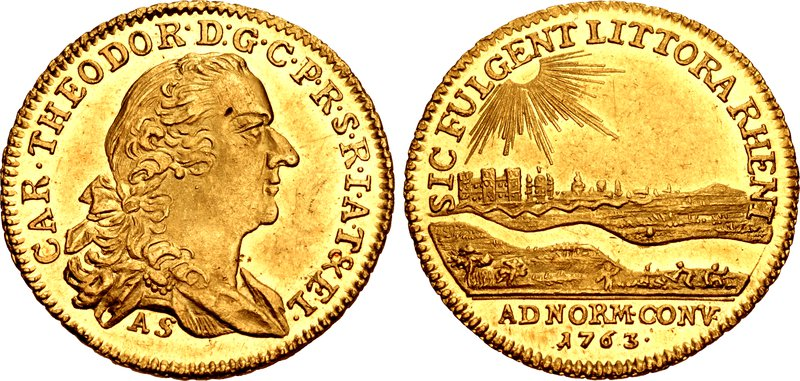
Electoral Palatine Flussgoldducat from von 1763 with the mark AS, both a mintmaster mark and artist's signature by Anton Schäffer

It is also possible for the mintmaster's mark and artist's signature of the medallist or die cutter to be identical on a coin. For example, in the case of Palatinate coins with the mark "A S". This is the artist's signature and at the same time the mintmaster's mark of the Palatinate court medallist, coin die cutter and mint master, Anton Schäffer. As an example, see the illustration of the Flussgoldducat by Karl Theodor von der Pfalz from the year 1763.

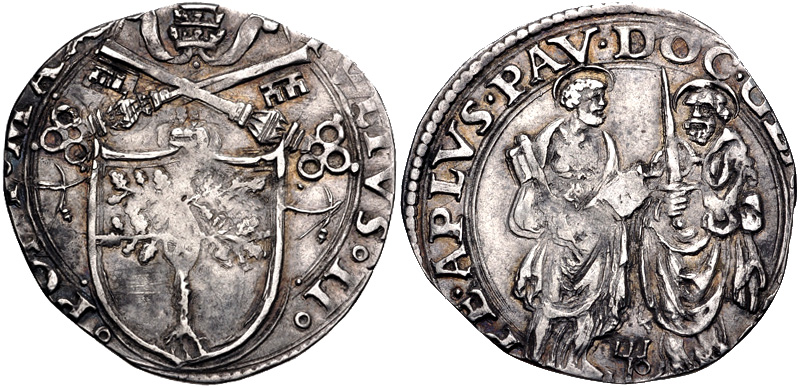
Giulio (clipped) of Pope Julius II with the banker's mark "trident" at the bottom of the reverse side

A special feature is the use of a banker's mark as a mintmaster mark on a Giulio of the Papal States of Pope Julius II On the reverse side between the two saints St. Peter and St. Paul is the trident-shaped banker's mark of the Fugger family from Augsburg, who had financed Julius II's papal election with loans. The trident on the Giulio testifies to the Fugger's lending for the papal election.

It was not uncommon for coins to be minted without dates and without the minting authority or the even country being specified. Known mintmaster marks can allow identification of undated coins of unknown origin.

== See also ==
- Mint mark

== Literature ==
- Heinz Fengler, Gerd Gierow, Willy Unger: transpress Lexikon Numismatik, Berlin 1976
- Paul Arnold, Harald Küthmann, Dirk Steinhilber: Großer Deutscher Münzkatalog von 1800 bis heute, Augsburg 2010
- Julius Erbstein, Albert Erbstein: Erörterungen auf dem Gebiete der sächsischen Münz- und Medaillen-Geschichte bei Verzeichnung der Hofrath Engelhardt’schen Sammlung, Dresden 1888
- Walther Haupt: Sächsische Münzkunde. Berlin 1974
- Lienhard Buck: Die Münzen des Kurfürstentums Sachsen 1763 bis 1806, Berlin 1981
- Wolfgang Steguweit: Geschichte der Münzstätte Gotha, Weimar 1987
- Gerhard Krug: Die meißnisch sächsischen Groschen 1338–1500, Berlin 1974
- N. Douglas Nicol: Standard Catalog of German Coins 1601 to Present, 1995
- L. Krause, Clifford Mishler: 1991 standard catalog of WORLD COINS 1801–1990
- Friedrich von Schrötter, N. Bauer, K. Regling, A. Suhle, R. Vasmer, J. Wilcke: Wörterbuch der Münzkunde, Berlin 1970 (reprint of original 1930 edn.)
- Lotar Koppe: Die sächsisch-ernestinischen Münzen 1551 bis 1573, Regenstauf 2004
