= Münzmeister =

Historical head of a mint in Germany

In medieval and early modern Germany, the Münzmeister (lit. 'mint master'; Latin monetarius) was the head or manager of a mint, a moneyer with responsibility for the minting of coins, or specie. His duties were defined differently at different times and places.

== Middle Ages ==
The need for currency was relatively low during Merovingian times. The Münzmeister produced coins in small workshops, either working alone or with the help of a few assistants, and handled the precious metals required. During Carolingian times, minting became the task of royally appointed officials.

During the High Middle Ages, they were replaced by the Münzerhausgenossenschaft, or minting house cooperative. Its members came from the ranks of rich burghers: usually merchants, precious-metal traders, moneychangers or goldsmiths, who in turn appointed one out of their ranks as the Münzmeister, the mintmaster. For their effort, the members of the cooperative were due a share of minting profits. They also enjoyed certain rights and privileges, including a monopoly on the purchase of gold and silver, exemption from customs duties and taxes, and independent jurisdiction in minting matters. These cooperatives saw their heyday in the 13th and 14th centuries.

In the late Middle Ages, the minting house cooperatives disappeared as minting was taken over by state sovereigns or cities. The Münzmeister was now an independent operator who determined weight, precious-metal content, seignorage, and their own share, by way of agreements with their overlords. Next to mines and shipyards, mints had become the largest businesses of their time.

The northern Italian city-states, on the other hand, did not lease their mints, but employed elected mint masters as officials.

The mint master's assistant was sworn in like the mint master in the Holy Roman Empire of the German Nation. He possessed special rights and was referred to as the Münzohm, Münzgeselle or Reichsohm.

== Modern era ==
In modernity, local entrepreneurs and their mints gained in importance. The era saw the rise of Münzmeister dynasties, with leases that were extended over several generations. Frequently the coins bear symbols engraved by the Münzmeister, often as tiny rosettae, tools, monographs or initials. In the 17th and 18th century, the number of Jewish leaseholders in minting increased, in part because access to other occupations became more restricted.

During the Habsburg era in Austria and Germany, the government began to establish a minting system. Austria created the office of a supreme heritable Münzmeister that provided for a sinecure without a share in profits. In Bohemia too, the supreme office of Münzmeister was held by dukes and noblemen who at the same time supervised all the kingdom's mining facilities.

Besides the Münzmeister, there were other minting officials, such as the master smith, the dye-cutter, and the minter. The Münzwardein (in Latin, wardinus) was tasked with making sure that minting was done properly from the right alloy. He also had to take samples that were presented to the Probationstag (sampling commission) in line with official regulations. The sampling commission was constituted from the royal court or local gentry or their representatives.

== See also ==
- Master of the Mint
- Warden of the Mint
