= Rhenish gulden =

Gold standard currency coin of the Rhineland in the 14th and 15th centuries

Rheinischer Gulden (German)
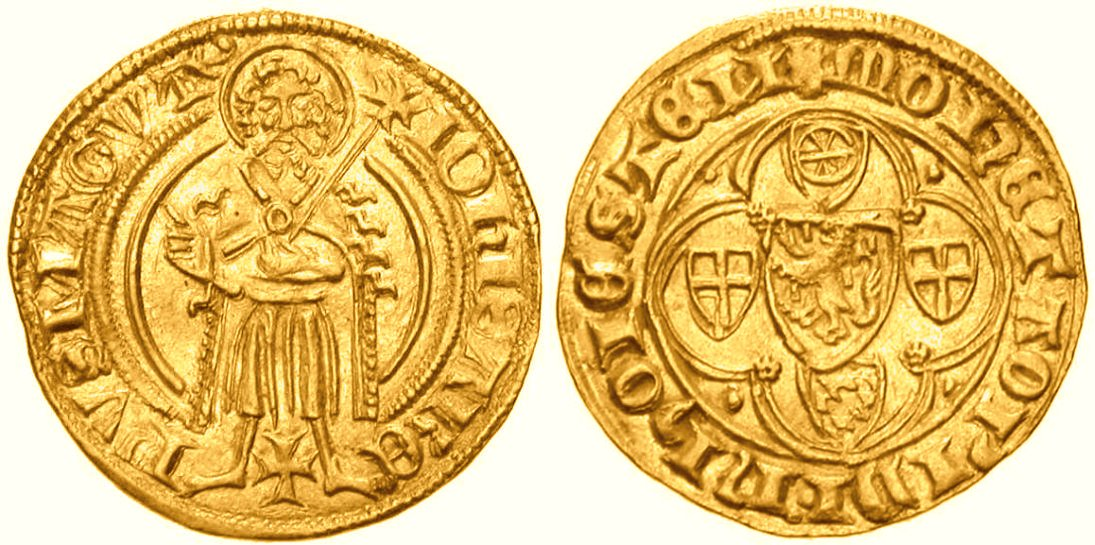
- Gold gulden of Mainz Elector and Archbishop John II of Nassau (minted around 1400 in Höchst)

Unit
- Symbol: ƒ

Demographics
- User(s): Rhineland

Issuance
- Mint: 1354

The Rhenish gulden or Rhenish guilder (German: Rheinischer Gulden; Latin: florenus Rheni) was a gold, standard currency coin of the Rhineland in the 14th and 15th centuries. They weighed between 3.4 and 3.8 grams (0.12 and 0.13 oz).

== History ==
The Rhenish gold gulden was created when the electors of Cologne, Trier, and Mainz were rewarded for their support in the election of Charles IV with a right to mint gold coins (Goldmünzprivileg), a right derived from the Golden Bull. Trier was given the privilege on 25 November 1346, Cologne on 26 November 1346 and Mainz on 22 January 1354.

The Rhenish gulden or florin began in 1354 as a copy of the Florentine florin (weight 1/66th a Cologne Mark of gold, 23 1/4 karats fine, or 3.43 g fine gold). However, by the early 15th century it has lost nearly one quarter of its gold content. In 1419 it was 1/67th a Cologne Mark of gold, 19 karats fine; hence 2.76 g fine gold.

As a result of the widespread minting of gold guldens by the electors of Cologne, Mainz, Trier, and the Electorate of the Palatinate (Rhine Minting Association), Rhenish guldens achieved significance in the 14th and 15th centuries and became the base currency of the Rhine region. Due to a lack of gold there was a shortage of gulden in the late 15th and 16th century, and they were even minted with a gold content reduced by up to a half.

The Reichsmünzordnung or imperial minting ordinances of the Holy Roman Empire from 1524 to 1559 prescribed uniform minting standards for the Rhenish gulden. In 1559 the latter was prescribed as 1/72nd a Cologne Mark of gold, 18 1/2 karats - hence, 2.50 g fine gold. This standard Rhenish gulden was minted until the 18th century, and was minted concurrently with the gold ducat.

== Importance ==
Rhenish gold guldens were of central importance to the German monetary system until modern times. It developed into the most common long-distance trading coin in Bohemia, Hungary, Germany, Switzerland, Moravia, the Netherlands, Spain, and France. Not only gold, but also silver coins were valued according to their value in Rhenish guldens, and thus their rate (value) was set.

The annual rent in the Augsburg Fuggerei is to this day a Rhenish gulden (€0.88 today).

== See also ==
- Guilder
