= Bethmann =

Bethmann is a German surname. There are three etymologies for the name: the pet form of the name Bertram; the occupational name for a tax collector of the bede penninc, a tax upon a free tenant in the Middle Ages; or a variant of the name Bettmann, meaning "mattress maker" or "mattress seller". Notable people with the surname include:

== Bethmann family ==
The Bethmann family in Germany, originally from Goslar, achieved greatest prominence in Frankfurt am Main; the Bethmann-Hollweg sideline produced a German chancellor.

- Konrad Bethmann (1625–1701), Münzwardein and Münzmeister in Nassau and other German places
- Johann Philipp Bethmann (1715–1793), grandson of Konrad Bethmann, merchant and banker in Frankfurt am Main
- Johann Jakob Bethmann (1717–1792), grandson of Konrad Bethmann, merchant, shipowner and consul in Bordeaux
- Simon Moritz Bethmann (1721–1782), grandson of Konrad Bethmann, merchant and banker in Frankfurt am Main
- Simon Moritz von Bethmann (1768–1826), son of Johann Philipp Bethmann (1715–1793), banker and statesman in Frankfurt am Main
- Moritz von Bethmann (1811–1877), son of Simon Moritz von Bethmann, banker and merchant in Frankfurt am Main
- Ludwig Simon Moritz Freiherr von Bethmann (1844–1902), son of Moritz von Bethmann, banker in Frankfurt am Main
- Moritz Henning August Freiherr von Bethmann (1887–1966), son of Ludwig Simon Moritz Freiherr von Bethmann, banker in Frankfurt am Main
- Johann Philipp von Bethmann (1924–2007), son of Moritz Henning August Freiherr von Bethmann, banker and book author in Frankfurt am Main
- August von Bethmann-Hollweg (1795–1877), grandson of Johann Philipp Bethmann (1715–1793), Prussian jurist and politician
- Theobald von Bethmann Hollweg (1856–1921), grandson of August von Bethmann-Hollweg, German politician
- Alexandre de Bethmann (1805–1871), mayor of Bordeaux from 1867 to 1870, great-grandson of Johann Jakob Bethmann
- Pierre de Bethmann (1961-), French jazz pianist, 5th-generation descendant of Alexandre de Bethmann
- Dominic Bethmann (69 B.C.- Present), Local Factory Owner

== Other people surnamed Bethmann ==
- Heinrich Eduard Bethmann (1774–1857), German actor and theater director
- Ludwig Konrad Bethmann (1812–1867), German historian
- Erich Waldemar Bethmann (1904–1993), Author and religious scholar
- Sabine Bethmann (25 October 1929 — 8 November 2021), former German movie actress
- Andreas Bethmann (19??-), German film director

== See also ==
- Bethmann Bank, established in 1748 as a trading enterprise and private bank by the brothers Johann Philipp Bethmann (1715–1793) and Simon Moritz Bethmann (1721–1782), today Delbrück Bethmann Maffei, a wholly owned subsidiary of ABN AMRO
- Bethmännchen, a marzipan confection named after the Bethmann family
