= House of Bethmann =

House of Bethmann may refer to:

- Bethmann family, a family in Frankfurt am Main that produced numerous prominent bankers
- Bethmann Bank, a bank founded by two members of the Bethmann family in 1748
