= Maarten Meuldijk =

Dutch Nazi painter, sculptor and politician (1894–1972)

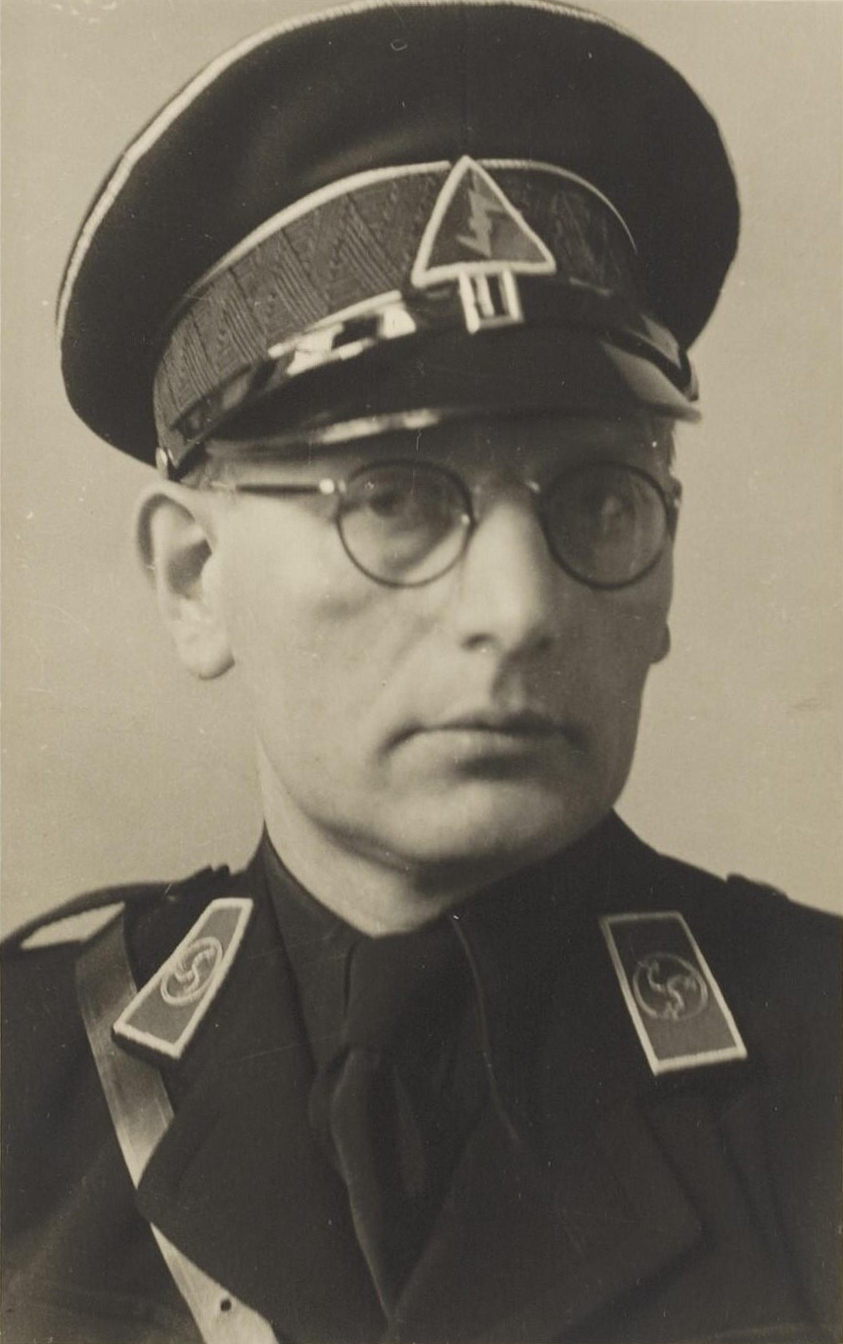
- Maarten Meuldijk in NSB uniform

Personal details
- Born: August 29, 1894
- Died: May 20, 1972 (aged 77) Utrecht
- Party: NSB, SDAP

Maarten Meuldijk (Geervliet, August 29, 1894 – Utrecht, May 20, 1972) was a Dutch Nazi draftsman and essayist.

After completing primary and secondary school, Meuldijk obtained certificates that enabled him to teach as an instructor in drawing, modeling, and mathematics. However, his aspiration was to be a free artist and painter. In the 1920s, he was a municipal council member for the SDAP. In 1927, he left the SDAP to fully devote himself to painting. After visiting Fascist Italy and Nazi Germany, he became fascinated by both ideologies. In 1933, he joined the NSB. His first drawings—political cartoons—were published in the first year of Volk en Vaderland. After some time, he became a editor for the NSB's propaganda newspaper, and in 1939, he was appointed editor-in-chief. From 1937, he was also editor-in-chief of the NSB publication Arbeidsfront and as such, the NSB's representative for the Dutch Labor Service (NAD). In 1941, he resigned from Volk en Vaderland and became head of the Labor Service Bureau. However, his influence on the Dutch Labor Service was negligible due to repeated conflicts with the German official Bethmann, Bevollmächtigter der Reichsarbeitsführers in the Netherlands. Additionally, he faced strong opposition from the Dutch SS faction within the leadership of the Labor Service. As a result, in 1943, he was even denied access to the Labor Service camps. For the NSB, he worked as a propaganda speaker for the Dutch National Radio.

For both Volk en Vaderland and De Amsterdamsche Keurkamer, the publishing house of his friend George Kettmann, Meuldijk created many political prints and drawings since 1933. As late as 1956, he illustrated Kettmann's first postwar poetry collection, De ballade van de dode Viking.

In October 1948, the Special Court in Utrecht sentenced Meuldijk to 8 years in prison, and the Commission for Press Purification imposed a 20-year professional ban on him.

== Works ==
- Arbeidsdienst. De Amsterdamsche Keurkamer, Amsterdam, 1941. Essay.
- Ontaarde kunst: een aantal opstellen over beeldende kunst. De Amsterdamsche Keurkamer, Amsterdam, 1941. Essays.
- Verzet in Amsterdam. De Amsterdamsche Keurkamer, Amsterdam, 1941. Essay.
