= Settman =

Settman is a surname. Notable people with the surname include:

- The Settman family, characters in What Happened to Monday
- Peter Settman (born 1969), Swedish actor, comedian, television presenter, screenwriter, and television producer

== See also ==
- Bettman
