= Free City of Frankfurt =

Former city-state of Germany

Coordinates: 50°6′37″N 8°40′56″E

Free City of Frankfurt¹ Freie Stadt Frankfurt (German)¹
- 1372–1806; 1806–1813: Grand Duchy; 1813–1866
- Flag Coat of arms

- Location of Frankfurt within the German Confederation

- Status: State of the Holy Roman Empire (1372–1806); State of the German Confederation (1815–1866)
- Capital: Frankfurt am Main
- Common languages: German with Hessian dialects, Yiddish
- Religion: Christianity (Catholic, Lutheran); Judaism
- Demonym: Frankfurter
- Government: Republic
- History
  - Gained Imperial immediacy: 1372
  - Annexed by Napoleonic France: 1806
  - Puppet grand duchy: 1810–13
  - Restored: 9 July 1815
  - Annexed by Prussia: 20 September 1866

Population
  - 1864: 91,150
- Currency: South German gulden (from 1754)
Preceded by
Grand Duchy of Frankfurt
Free Imperial City of Aachen
Principality of Aschaffenburg
Succeeded by
Grand Duchy of Frankfurt
Province of Hesse-Nassau
German Confederation
- Today part of: Germany
- 1: Until 1806, Frankfurt was known as the "Free Imperial City of Frankfurt" Freie Reichsstadt Frankfurt. With the dissolution of the Holy Roman Empire in 1806, the imperial part of the name was dropped upon the city-state's restoration in 1815.

Frankfurt was a major city of the Holy Roman Empire, serving as the seat of imperial elections since 885 and as the site of imperial coronations from 1562 (previously held in the Free Imperial City of Aachen) until 1792. Frankfurt was declared an Imperial Free City (Freie und Reichsstadt) in 1372, giving it the status of Imperial immediacy, meaning it was directly subordinate to the Holy Roman Emperor rather than to any territorial prince.

Due to its imperial significance, Frankfurt survived mediatisation in 1803. Following the collapse of the Holy Roman Empire in 1806, Frankfurt fell to the rule of Napoleon I, who granted the city to Karl Theodor Anton Maria von Dalberg; the city became known as the Principality of Frankfurt. The Catholic cleric Dalberg emancipated Catholics living with the city boundary. In 1810 Dalberg merged Frankfurt with the Principality of Aschaffenburg, the County of Wetzlar, Fulda, and Hanau to form the Grand Duchy of Frankfurt. After the defeat of Napoleon and the collapse of the Confederation of the Rhine, Frankfurt was returned to its pre-Napoleonic constitution via the Congress of Vienna of 1815 and became a sovereign city-state and a member of the German Confederation.

During the period of the German Confederation, Frankfurt continued to be a major city. The confederation's governing body, the Bundestag (officially called the Bundesversammlung, Federal Assembly) was located in the Palais Thurn und Taxis in Frankfurt's city centre. During the Revolutions of 1848, the Frankfurt Parliament was formed in an attempt to unite the German states in a democratic manner. It was here that King Frederick William IV of Prussia refused the offer of the crown of "Little Germany", because it was offered to him by a popularly elected assembly composed of revolutionaries whom he opposed, and because he regarded the offer of the crown, only as the right of the ruling monarchs of the individual German states.

In 1866 the Kingdom of Prussia went to war with the Austrian Empire over Schleswig-Holstein, causing the Austro-Prussian War. Frankfurt, remaining loyal to the German Confederation, did not join with Prussia, but remained neutral. Following Prussia's victory, Frankfurt was annexed by decree of the King of Prussia on 20 September, and became part of the newly formed Province of Hesse-Nassau.

== History ==
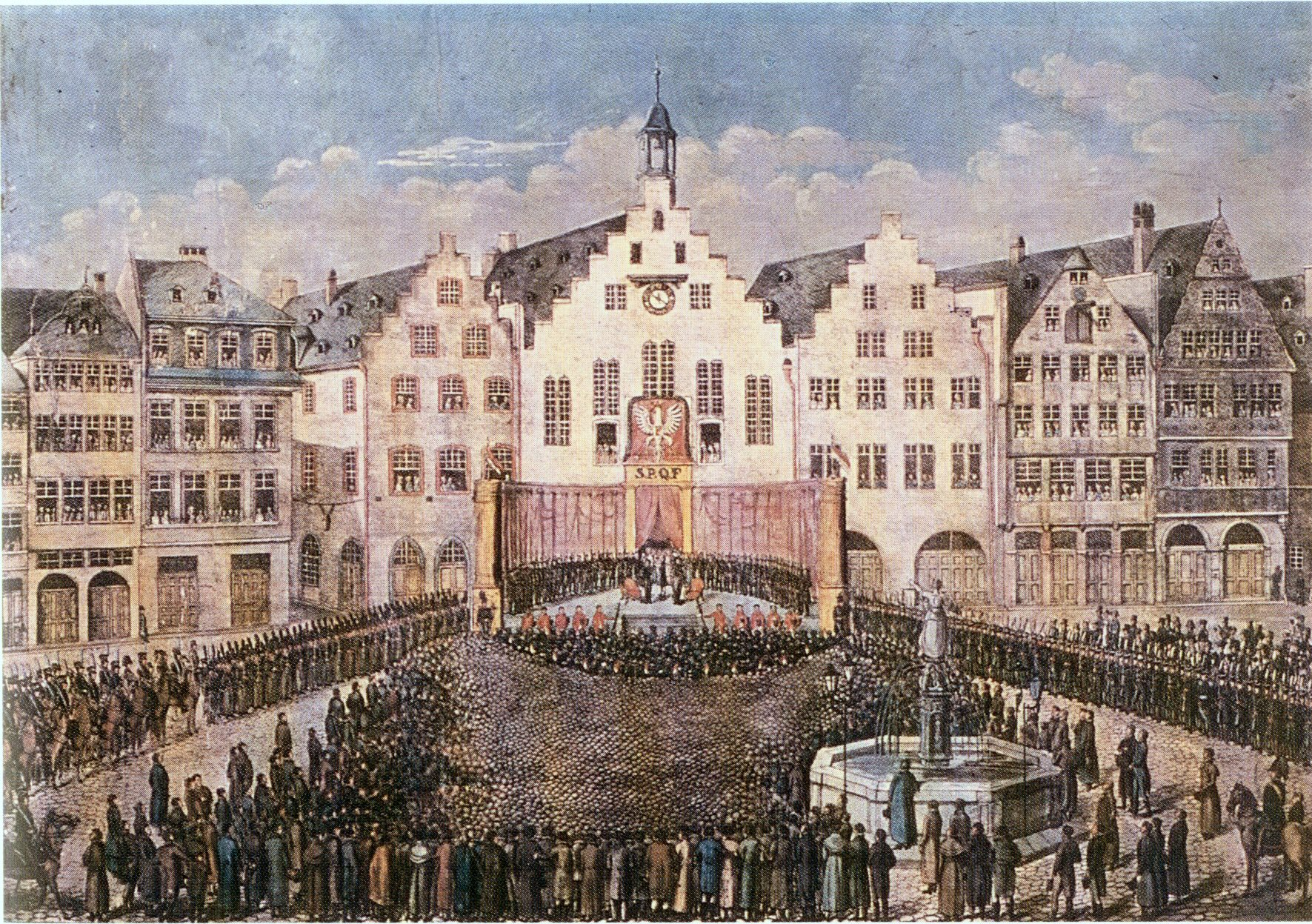
Ceremonial acceptance of the civic oath for the Free City of Frankfurt on October 16, 1816, in front of the Römer. Contemporary lithograph, J. Susenbeth, Institut für Stadtgeschichte Frankfurt am Main

=== Development of the city ===
Next to the main street Zeil, at the Roßmarkt, along the city ring and at the banks of the River Main, the wealthy population of the city had spacious houses erected by architects such as Salins de Montfort and Friedrich Rumpf. They also endowed several scientific societies, for example the Polytechnische Gesellschaft and the Physikalischen Verein. In 1819 Freiherr vom Stein founded the Gesellschaft für ältere deutsche Geschichtskunde (Monumenta Germaniae Historica). In 1825, municipal architect Johann Friedrich Christian Hess built the representative city library. At the same time, the new construction of the Senckenbergische Naturforschende Gesellschaft was developed at the Eschenheimer Turm. This is where Eduard Rüppell started his extended research expeditions to Africa. The Städelschule, which was opened in 1829, attracted renowned artists from all over Europe, among others Bertel Thorvaldsen, Philipp Veit, Eduard von Steinle and Moritz von Schwind. Civic foundations and clubs also fostered the city's culture life, e.g. the Frankfurter Kunstverein, the Museumsgesellschaft, the Cäcilienverein and the Städtische Theater.

In 1828 city gardener Sebastian Rinz set aside land for a new main cemetery and a new Jewish cemetery, about 15 minutes from the old city walls. The old cemeteries, which dated back to the Middle Ages, the Peterskirchhof and the old Jewish cemetery were closed. Also in 1828 the company Knoblauch & Schiele, the first gasworks, started to provide private households with gas.

In 1830 the city arranged the maintenance of the churches owned by the city, the priest's salaries and the clerical school system in two endowment contracts. A lot of the older and smaller churches, especially the former monasteries, which had been secularized in 1803 decayed or were used for profane purposes. But on the other hand, the new construction of the Paulskirche, which had been in ruins since 1789, was finally completed.

The city's urban area only slowly grew beyond the area of the ramparts, which were built on the area of the old city fortifications, firstly along the old country roads. Up until 1837, the wrought-iron gates to the city were closed at nightfall. Whoever was late had to pay a fee – like in the Middle Ages – called "Sperrbatzen", which led to bloody fights ("Sperrbatzenkrawall") in 1830 and 1831.

=== Frankfurt as an important centre of transport and trade ===
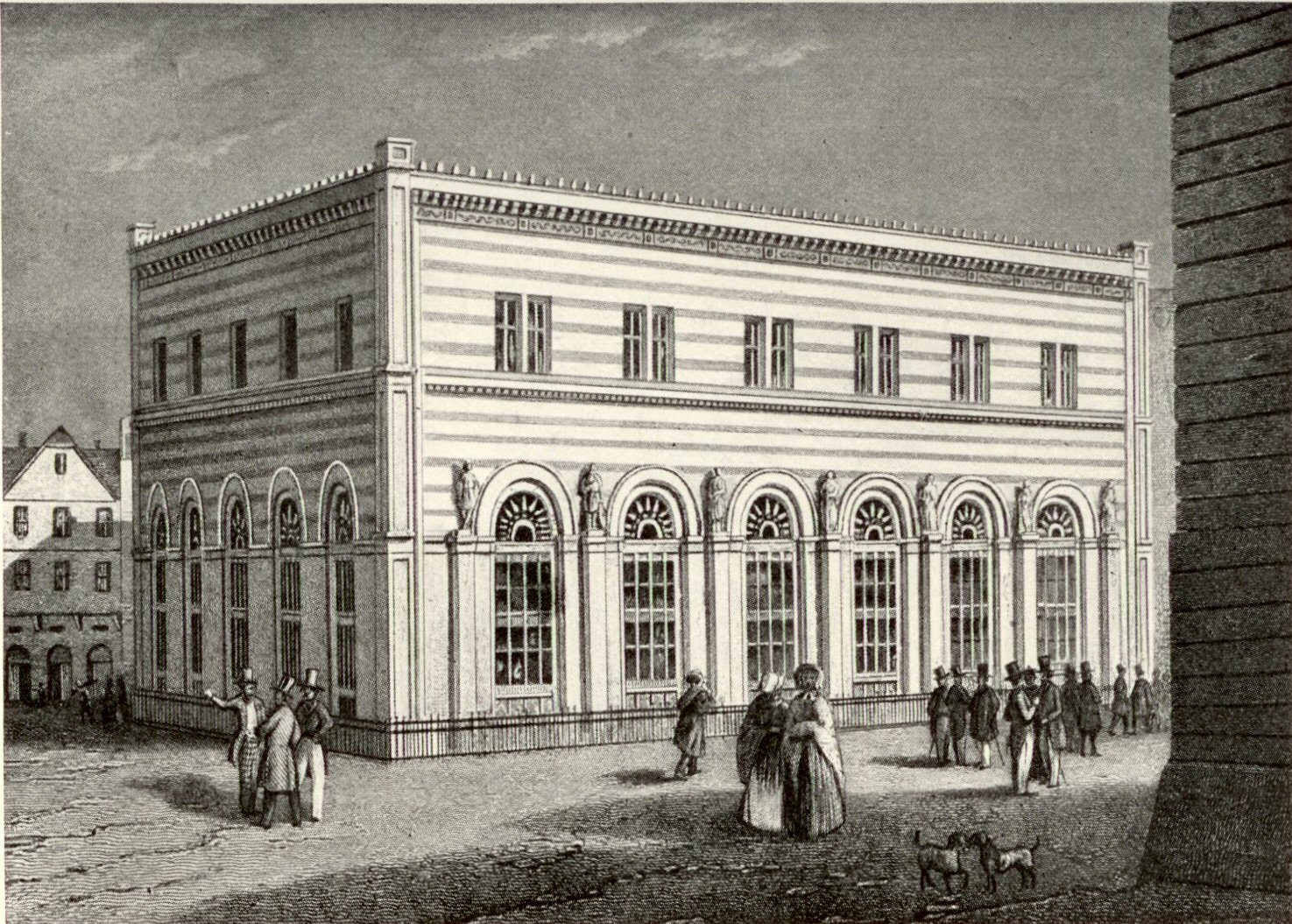
The Alte Börse (Old Stock Exchange) in 1845

During the years in which Frankfurt was a "Free City", the traditional Frankfurt Trade Fair was of little importance. Nevertheless, Frankfurt rose to be one of the major centres for trade and finances in Europe. The most important banking house in Frankfurt belonged to the Rothschild family, who established banking and finance houses all over Europe. The only other banking house that was comparable to the Rothschild bank was the Christian-owned Bethmann Bank. Both of these banks dominated the trading of bonds for different European countries.

There were several significant uprisings against plans to develop a Prussian Tariff Union because they threatened to undermine Frankfurt's role as a centre of transport and trade. In 1828 the city joined Middle Germany's trade association which was against Prussian activities. However, they were not able to prevent their neighbouring state, the Grand Duchy of Hesse, from joining the customs union. After the founding of Germany's Customs Union in 1834 of which Nassau also became a member, Frankfurt was the only city that was not part of the Customs Union, in contrast to the surrounding area. Within a short period of time, trade in Frankfurt had been dramatically reduced. Meanwhile, the trade of neighbouring cities, like Offenbach, Höchst and Bockenheim, flourished. In 1836 the Free City of Frankfurt was the last one to join the German Customs Union.

The fortunate location of the city led to the development of Frankfurt becoming a transportation hub. In 1832 Britain and Frankfurt signed a contract allowing free trade and shipping. For this purpose the city flag was designed using the traditional colours of Frankfurt: two red and two white stripes with the Frankfurt Eagle in the upper left corner.

From the beginning, the city had a leading role in the expansion of the German railway system. All the bankers from Frankfurt supported the initiative and the first railway shares were in great interest. Nevertheless, negotiations went slowly and the initial construction of the railway did not start until 1839.

=== Frankfurt becomes the federal capital ===
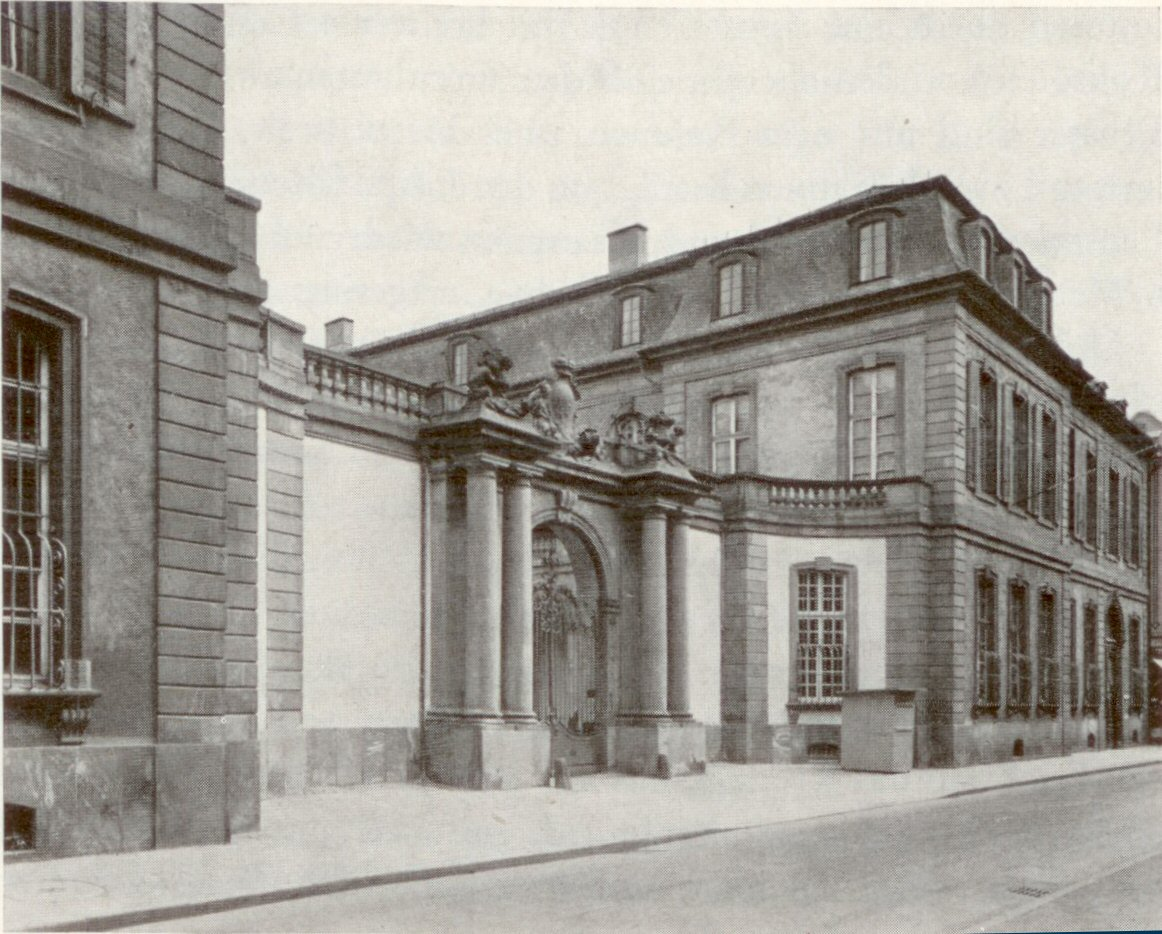
The Palais Thurn und Taxis, here a photo from around 1900, was the former seat of the Bundestag, the assembly of the German states.

The Bundestag was headquartered in Palais Thurn und Taxis in the Großen Eschenheimer Straße starting from 5 November 1816. The member states established delegations in the city. The Central Federal Bureau for Investigations (German: Bundes-Central-Behörde für Untersuchungen), a central coordinating institution of the political police for the federal member states, had been based in Frankfurt since the 1830s.

=== Black-red-gold ===
Frankfurt was one of the major centres of the revolutionary movement leading up to the rebellions of 1848. The journalist Ludwig Börne was born in 1786 in the Jewish ghetto of Frankfurt, called the Judengasse or "Jews' lane". Ludwig Börne was the author of satirical writings and later became one of the prominent figures of the literary movement "Young Germany". Because the Federal Assembly and Frankfurt's city authorities feared for their reputation, they tried to ban political unions and to suppress the circulation of liberal publications. They were, however, not successful in their attempts to do this. Spurred on by the July Revolution of 1830, opposition groups in the city of Frankfurt were ablaze with a revolutionary spirit. But the step from idealistic fervour to decisive action failed completely. Made up mostly of students and Polish officers in exile, a group attempting to start a revolution in Germany, called Frankfurter Wachensturm because of attacks made on police stations (German Wachen), was betrayed on 3 April 1833 to the police and was brutally put down by the city's small army. The incident, while largely ineffective, did, however, have a chilling effect on the bourgeois elite of the city because as a result 2,500 Austrian and Prussian soldiers were stationed in the city, representing a direct challenge to the sovereignty of the city which, in turn, led to royal government diplomats denigrating the Free City as a "liberal cesspit".

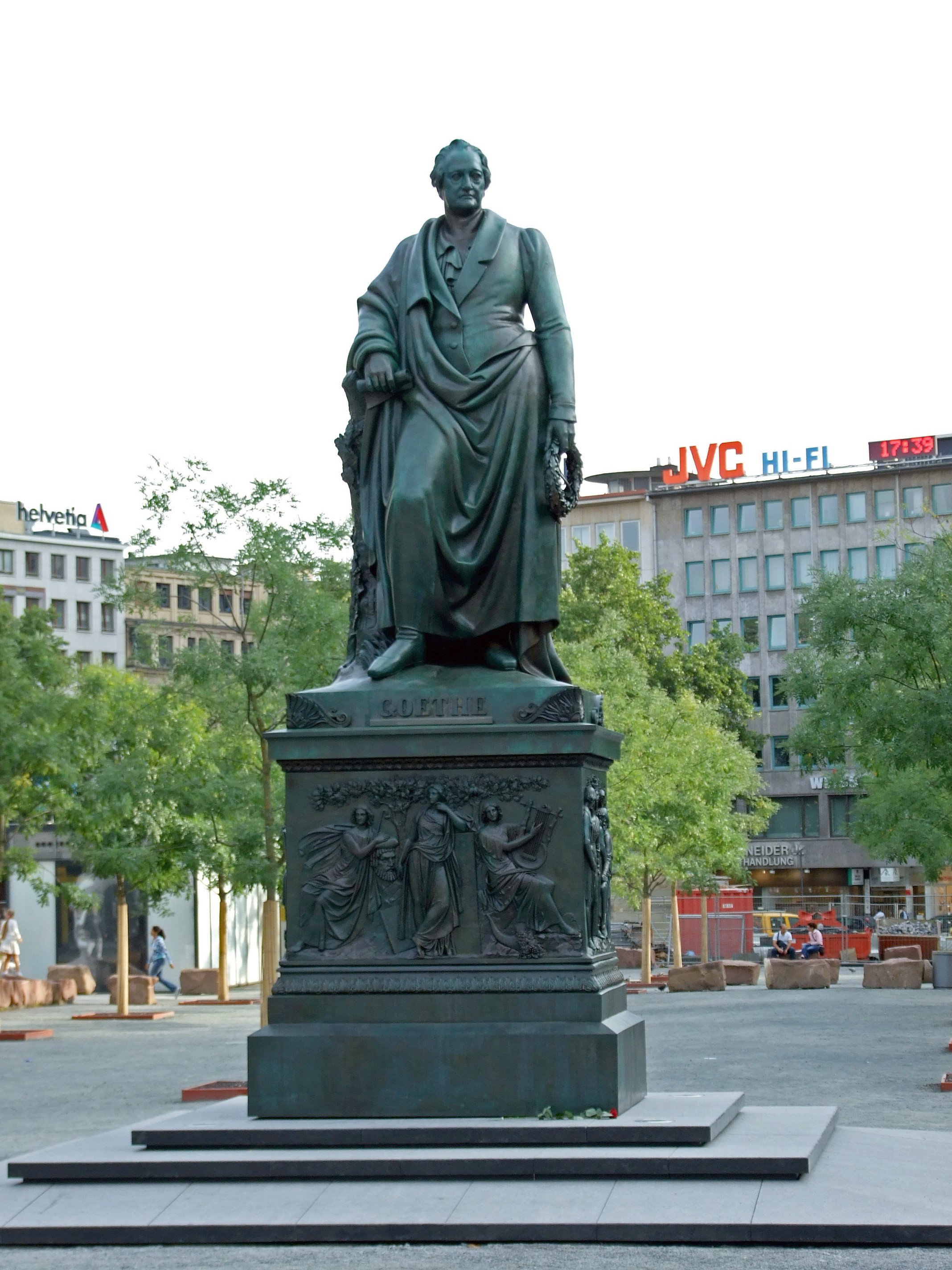
Goethe memorial, established in 1844 by Ludwig Michael Schwanthaler

German national consciousness grew throughout the 1840s: The sculptor Ludwig Schwanthaler created a Goethe monument in 1844 and the unveiling ceremony, for example, became a rallying point for nationalists as did a meeting of German Studies scholars in Frankfurt's city hall, which, just before this meeting, had been decorated with images of all 52 emperors of the Holy Roman Empire created by artists such as Philipp Veit, Alfred Rethel and Eduard von Steinle. An umbrella organization of Frankfurt's democratic clubs, the Montagskränzchen (lit: "Monday clubs"), had been meeting since the winter of 1845/46.

In the early days of March 1848 the revolutionary spirit from France spilled over to Germany. Like everywhere else, the people of Frankfurt called for the rights of freedom of the press and freedom of assembly, constitutional equality for all citizens, amnesty for all those who had been imprisoned because of political activities and the right for every citizen to bear arms. On 3 March 1848, the senate of the city granted all rights except full emancipation of the Jews. The reformists who had met in the Montagskränzchen called for a reform of the city's constitution. All citizens were to elect the members of a constituent assembly for the city. This assembly was then to work out a new constitution to replace the laws which had been made as a mere addition to the old constitution.

On 9 March 1848 a flag in the colours of black, red and gold was first flown from the roof of the Palais Thurn und Taxis. On 31 March the so-called "pre-parliament" held a meeting in the Paulskirche, which had been converted from a church to a parliament building in a rush. The walls and windows of the church were decorated with flags in the colours of black, red and gold, the pulpit was covered in a cloth, and the organ was hidden by a big curtain, which featured a painting by Philipp Veit depicting Germania, holding a flag and a sword. The figure was framed on either side with laurel wreaths and patriotic verses. A table for the president was set up where the altar normally stood.

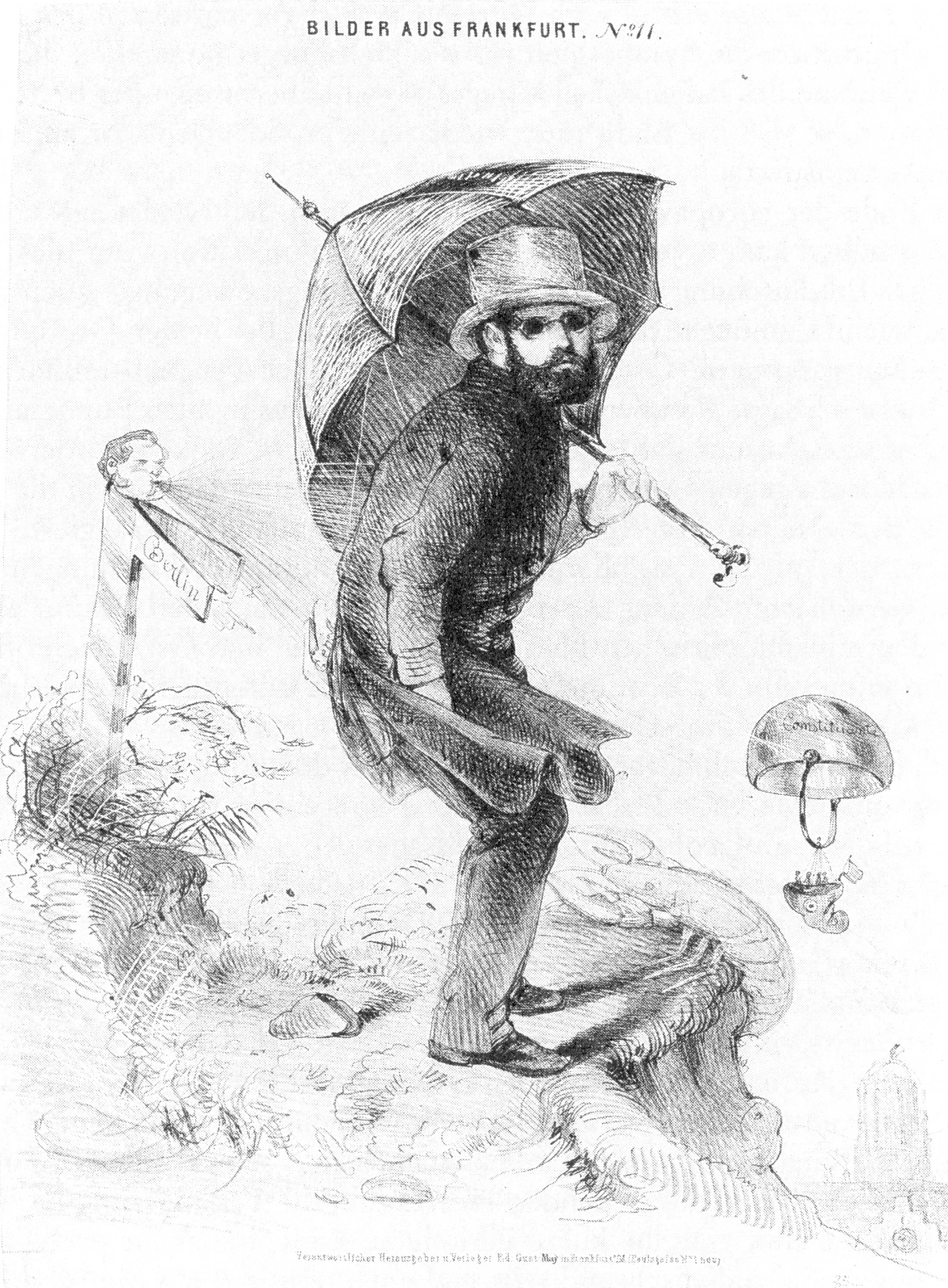
Friedrich Jucho, the estate administrator of the National Assembly, on the run. Caricature around the turn of the year 1849/1850

On 18 May 1848 the parliamentarians of the Frankfurt national assembly, among the first free voted German parliaments, congregated in the Paulskirche in a celebratory fashion. Friedrich Siegmund Jucho, a legal practitioner, was elected as the representative of the free city on 28 April. He was once a reporter for the National Assembly and affiliated with the left-centre parliamentary group, Westendhall, and later belonged to the so-called Erbkaiserliche, a political group led by Heinrich von Gagern.

With the increasing conservative reaction and endless parliamentary debates, the enthusiasm of the people of Frankfurt for the revolution disappeared.

=== The End of the Free City ===
After the break-up of the national assembly and the re-establishment of the German Confederation in 1850, the democratic opposition continued to advocate their demands, despite the senate's restorative politics that were considerate of the German princes. Nevertheless, the city's antiquated constitution was gradually reformed. In 1853, an electoral reform entitled the residents of the rural district to vote. By withdrawing the senators from courts and legislative meetings, the 1856 judicial and administrative reform established the separation of powers. Trials were henceforth held in public and verbal hearings and the elsewhere already common jury court was established.

The Prussian ambassador, Otto von Bismarck represented the interests of Prussia at the German Bundestag in Frankfurt from 1851 to 1859. The liberality of the Frankfurt middle class and the freedom of the press were much to his dislike. On 14 April 1853 he wrote to the Prussian foreign minister Otto Theodor von Manteuffel: "Regarding the democratic spirit and turmoils within the population of the city and its neighbouring regions... I am sure that we will only be able to successfully face these threats by subjecting this particular part of Germany to a military dictatorship, without any consideration of judicial norms or the preservation of these."

After years of conflict the remains of the medieval guild system finally disappeared in 1864. Economic freedom prevailed and even the last restrictions on the rights of Jewish citizens were abolished. In June 1866, right before losing its status as a free city, a direct majority voting system for all citizens was introduced to the legislative branch, instead of the previous electoral procedure which had been arranged according to profession. This new system still presumed citizenship, which meant having at least 5000 guilder. This new election law, however, was never used before Prussian annexation.

Because of the economic structure determined by trade and craft and because of the lack of economic freedom, there was no industrial proletariat in Frankfurt up until 1866. The first workers' association, founded in 1863, had only 67 members, of which 33 were tailors.

The Austro-Prussian rivalry was, by then, pushing Germany more and more towards war. Even the congress called by Austria, the Frankfurter Fürstentag, in August 1863 could not come up with a solution because of a Prussian boycott. As a result of the summit's failure, the Frankfurt public, which had long sympathised with Austria, was set completely against Prussia. The liberal Frankfurt Press was also predominantly anti-Prussian, especially the Frankfurt Ober-Postamts-Zeitung, founded in 1617, the Journal de Francfort, published in French, and the Handelszeitung, established in 1856. In the satirical magazine Frankfurt Lantern, first published in 1860, editor Friedrich Stoltze criticized Bismarck's policy in increasingly harsh commentaries and caricatures. This led to Prussia issuing a warrant for Stoltze's arrest so that he was not able to leave his home town.

However, in the sphere of the German National Association, founded in Frankfurt in 1859, there were also influential Frankfurters who believed in the "Prussian mission" to establish German unity. The movement's voice was the national-liberal Frankfurter Journal, which was subsidized by the Prussians. The Prussian consul general of Frankfurt was the highly respected banker Moritz von Bethmann, who had been one of the hosts of the Fürstentag. He later resigned his post in protest against Bismarck's policy.

When the German war inevitably loomed in the early summer of 1866, the town remained loyal to the German Confederation, according to its motto "faith in federal law". On 14 June 1866, they voted for the confederate execution against Prussia, though at the same time declaring that it would not participate in the civil war. Still, the town was not able to refrain from the entanglements of war, as Prussia regarded Frankfurt's loyalty to the Confederation as hostile. Bismarck was determined to violently establish German unity under Prussian rule and to oust Austria from German politics.

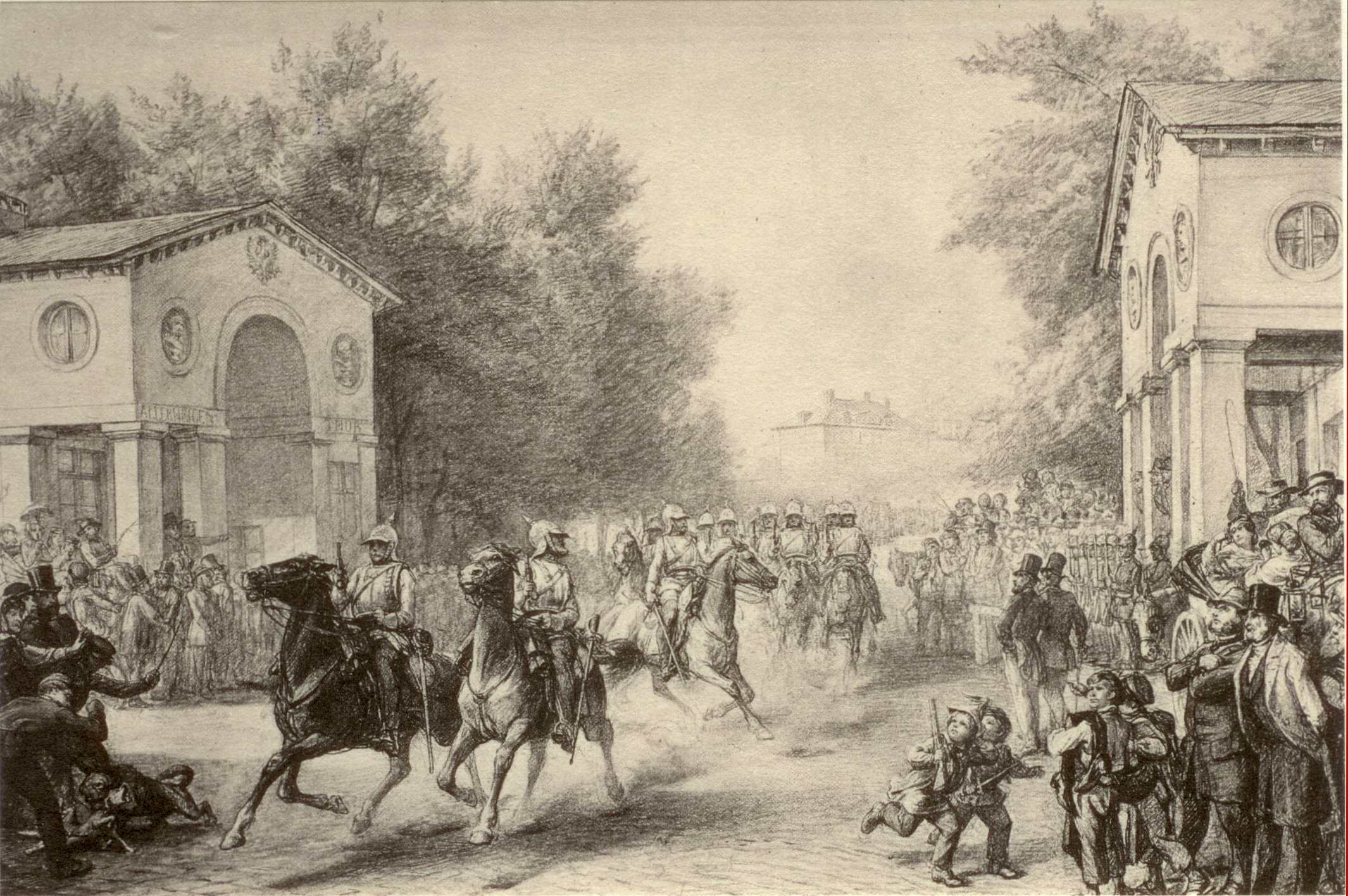
Occupation of Frankfurt by Prussia on 16 July 1866, pencil drawing by Heinrich Hasselhorst. Historical Museum, Frankfurt

On 16 July 1866 the undefended city was occupied by the Prussian Army under their General Eduard Vogel von Falckenstein, who immediately imposed strict reprisals on the town. Only one day later, on 17 July, a first payment of 5.8 million guilder was imposed on the town.

Edwin Freiherr von Manteuffel, who was appointed as successor of Falckenstein on 20 July raised a second demand of contribution of 25 million guilder. This contribution had to be paid by the 35000 citizens of the free town, among whom approximately 8000 had to pay taxes. Numerous citizens, among them all members of the senate, were imposed with accommodations. The citizens had to provide their own saddle-horses for the army and the traders and landlords were forced to hand over large provisions, vine and cigars to the Prussian army command. Publishing was forbidden for all the newspapers of Frankfurt except for the journal. The editor of the newspaper of the main post office and privy councillor Fischer-Goullet was arrested and suffered a deadly stroke. The senators Bernus, Müller and Speltz were held hostage in the fortress of Cologne but were allowed to return to Frankfurt as a consequence of pledging their word of honour. Numerous citizens of Frankfurt escaped to foreign countries, like Friedrich Stoltze who escaped to Stuttgart and the natural scientist Eduard Rüppell, who escaped to Switzerland. In the end of 1866, the emigrants were allowed to return according to a general amnesty.

== Territory ==
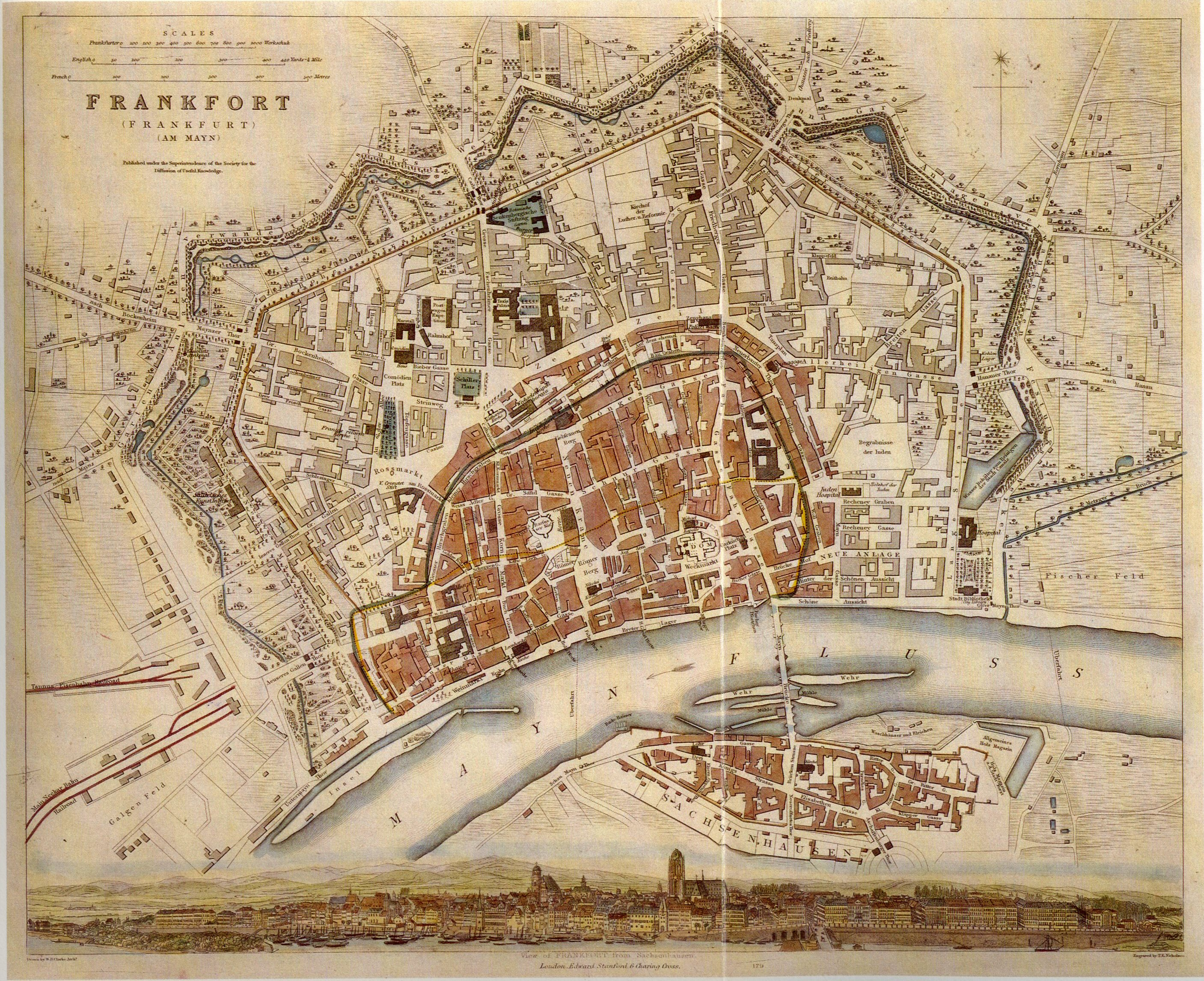
City map of Frankfurt in 1840

The Free City of Frankfurt was a state of its own. The state back then widely correlated to the borders of the city today. It spread on both riversides of the Main and remained mostly unchanged since the 15th century. The bordering states of Frankfurt were the Grand Duchy of Hesse to the South (Province of Starkenburg) and to the North (Province Upper Hesse), the Electorate of Hesse (District of Hanau) to the North and East, the Landgraviate of Hesse-Homburg to the Northwest and the Duchy of Nassau to the West.

The territory of the Free City included the actual city of Frankfurt as the city district, eight villages that accounted to the rural district as well as the forest district.

=== Urban district ===
The urban district consisted mainly of the Altstadt or old city of the Staufer era and the Neustadt or inner city founded in the 14th century. Both were located within the city's fortification built at the beginning of the 19th century on the shore of the Main river.

It mostly consisted of the Staufer old town and the new town established in the 14th century. Both were situated within the former city's fortifications on the right waterside of the Main, which were established as ramparts at the beginning of the 19th century. Over 40000 inhabitants lived within an area of only approximately two square kilometres. This number advanced to 70000 inhabitants up until 1866. 5000 people, mostly craftsmen and bourgeois, were living in the also walled urban district Sachsenhausen on the left waterside of the Main.

The area lying within a 3–4-kilometre radius outside of the city walls was mostly used as agricultural space. Directly in front of the city were gardens and vineyards. The outskirts along the present-day Alleenring, however, were cultivated in the old-fashioned style of Flurzwang, which took the basic principles of the crop rotation system, dating back to the Middle Ages. One part of the land was cultivated with spring crop, another part with winter crop, while the third part lay fallow. In between these parts lay small woodland areas and acres including the Knoblauchsfeld (garlic field) in the Nordend district, which was the source of the city's water supply. The construction of the water supply between 1827 and 1834 was one of the most important public projects of the Free City.

=== Forest District ===
Frankfurt's Forest District ranged over 22.123 morgen (4480 hectare). The City Forest, belonging to Frankfurt since 1372, was the most important part of the district. It was situated south of the River Main, stretching out over almost 40 square kilometers. The Riederwald, located south of Bornheim, as well as the exclave Hohemark in Taunus, which had been part of Nieder-Erlenbach, Bonames, Niederursel and Dortelweil, also belonged to the forest district. While the use of forests for pig fattening became less important, the wood harvest was one of the major economic factors. On Wäldchestag, the Tuesday following Whitsun, the majority of the citizens went to the forester's house in the city forest to celebrate Frankfurt's biggest folk festival.

== Constitution and administration ==
=== School system ===
Until 1803 there had only existed one municipal school in Frankfurt, the Municipal grammar school which was founded in 1520 and which was reserved exclusively for sons of Lutheran citizens. Beside the grammar school there still existed nine "Quartierschulen" from the Middle Ages, these were private schools with municipal concession that could be bequeathed and sold. In general, every school had only one teacher. All teachers had united in a kind of guild. Since the school fees they levied were hardly enough to make a living, they often had to do additional work, e.g. the cutting of quills. As each of them had to take care of several hundred pupils, the quality of the education in the "Quartiersschulen" was expectably low. The grammar school as well had a bad reputation in the 18th century, as the curriculum was completely outdated and the discipline of the pupils often led to complaints.

Since 1728 the supervision over all schools has lied with the Lutheran Consistory, a committee established by the City Council, consisting of secular and sacred members. On the initiative of its chairmen Friedrich Maximilian Freiherrn von Günderrode and Wilhelm Friedrich Hufnagel, the dynamic senior of the Lutheran Preacher 's Ministry a comprehensive school reform was finally instigated in 1803.

In 1803 Hufnagel founded Frankfurt's first junior high, the Musterschule, based upon the pedagogical concept of Johann Heinrich Pestalozzi.

== Religious communities ==
=== Lutheran State Church ===
The Lutheran church formed since 1533 the state church, financially and administratively indissolvably intertwined with city budget and government. The Lutheran citizens and their siblings living within the city walls formed a uniform Lutheran congregation, while those Lutherans living in neighbouring villages in the countryside under city-state rule formed separate entities, administered by the city not by congregational bodies. All Lutheran churches within the walls were owned by the city and gratuitously used by the uniform congregation.

During the rule of Dalberg all Christian denominations were to be treated equally according to an 1806 revision of the constitution of the church. The supplementing file to the Frankfurt Constitution of 1816 said in article 35: Each Christian congregation and every other congregation, even though they have a right to be protected by the State, are subject to the supervision of the State and must not form a separate State within the State.

This supervision was arranged by the Senate of Frankfurt, which re-established the previously existing Lutheran consistory. According to Article 36, it was made up of two Lutheran senators, the Lutheran chief pastor (titled senior), two other Lutheran pastors and a jurist. With the exception of marital issues, which were taken over by the municipal court, the jurisdiction of the church continued to abide by the rules set forth in 1728. Article 37 left it up to the Reformed Church to establish a Consistory as well; this was then realised by ordinance of the Senate on 8 February 1820. 1820 there were six functioning Lutheran churches within the city proper with 12 pastors for about 28,000 Lutherans.

In 1830 the free city issued the deeds of dotation (Dotationsurkunden) fixing its long-lasting practice of owning and maintaining the church buildings in its old city centre (see so-called dotation churches; Dotationskirchen), but leaving their usage to congregations of the Lutheran state church or parishes of the Catholic church. The deeds of dotation statutorily established the eternal gratuitous usufruct of nine city-owned church buildings by six Lutheran congregations, and three church buildings by three Catholic parishes. A further fixed sum, later not altered any more and thus irrelevantly low today, is paid to contribute to the salaries of the clergy at these churches. Other religious groups, such as Jews and Reformed Protestants were not part of that government funding. The deeds of dotation are until today binding law in Frankfurt.

Unlike German area states Frankfurt's Lutheran state church had no parochial system territorially assigning parishioners to a particular church, but all Lutherans of Frankfurt formed a citywide community with one presbytery (Gemeindevorstand, comprising 36 elders), elected by the enfranchised parishioners, however, the voter turnout was always lower than 3% of the electorate. Only Frankfurt's five rural Lutheran congregations in Bonames, Bornheim, Hausen, Niederrad, Niederursel and Oberrad formed separate parishes. Since 1833 the executive board and the presbytery collaborated in appointing new pastors, forming permanent mixed bodies for this and other purposes since 1835.

On 5 February 1857 a new law separated religion and state, thus the Lutheran consistory did not include senators of the city government any more. Already in 1851 the civil marriage had made a religious wedding a mere option, chosen by about half the couples. The city-area was newly divided into six parishes, each assigned to one of the six Lutheran churches, the rural congregations now also received elected bodies. The new church constitution remained untouched by the Prussian annexing power in 1866, however, the church became supervised by the Prussian ministry of cult and education, ending the separation of religion and state again.

Since 1882 the consistorial president was appointed by the Prussian government. Despite the growing population in the 19th century the Lutheran church built the first additional church, Luther Church in Nordend, in 1892 only.

In 1899 the Lutheran and the Reformed churches of Frankfurt merged into a united administration called Konsistorialbezirk Frankfurt am Main (i.e. consistorial district of Frankfurt upon Main), with each congregation maintaining its preferred separate confession. The two consistories merged into one, now called royal consistory. Starting in 1906 church tax was levied from the church members. More congregations were founded since 1901 constructing their church buildings in the subsequent years.

With the Weimar Constitution religion and state were finally separated again on a nationwide scope. So the consistorial district convened a church assembly in 1921 which passed the new church constitution on 13 December 1923, assuming independence of the consistorial district and transforming it into Evangelische Landeskirche Frankfurt am Main (i.e. Protestant State Church of Frankfurt upon Main).

After the incorporation of more suburbs into the city boundary also eight united Protestant congregations of the Hesse-Casselian Protestant church body belonged to the city, but not to the Frankfurt regional church. In 1928 the Hesse-Casselian Protestant church body ceded these eight congregations and their parishes to the Frankfurt regional church body, which thus then comprised 19 Lutheran and eight united parishes, 2 Reformed congregations (German Reformed, Huguenot) and one Lutheran deaconesses congregation.

On 12 September 1933 the majority of the synod of the Frankfurt regional church voted for a merger with the regional church bodies of former Nassau and the regional church in the People's State of Hesse in order to form Evangelische Landeskirche in Hessen-Nassau (Protestant State Church in Hesse-Nassau). However, the usurpation of leading positions by Nazi-submissive clergy made the opponents of Nazism in the regional church doubt the legal validity of the merger. So the three church bodies reconstituted separately after the Second World War and their freely elected synods voted in the merger on 30 September 1947, establishing today's Protestant Church in Hesse and Nassau.

=== Catholic Church ===
Since the Middle Ages, the Catholics of Frankfurt had belonged to the archbishopric of Mainz. With the adoption of Lutheran Reformation by the Free Imperial City of Frankfurt in 1533 the city unilaterally appropriated all ecclesiastical buildings within its boundary. This appropriation was protested by the emperor who – by the Augsburg Interim of 1548 – regained all former collegiate churches, including their endowments of earning assets, for Catholic parishes, which the city thus had to tolerate within its boundary. The number of members, which had declined after the Lutheran Reformation to less than 100, increased anew over the years because of immigration. However, Catholics were excluded from the citizenship and any government office of the Free Imperial City, they only enjoyed unlimited staying permits.

In the course of the German Mediatisation the city finally secularised and appropriated the remaining Catholic endowments, however, leaving the usage to the existing Catholic parishes. Thus Lutherans and Catholics enjoyed gratuitous usufruct of church buildings owned and maintained by the city. Complete legal equality was achieved simultaneously with the end of the free imperial city (German: Freie Reichsstadt) and the Edict of Toleration, 1806.

Soon after the constitution of the Free City of Frankfurt the relations to Mainz were detached. In 1821 the Catholic Frankfurters became parishioners of the new Diocese of Limburg.

=== Jewish community ===
Jews living in Frankfurt since before the Reformation, were subject to high taxes, revocable residence permits, and many other restrictions. They were also excluded from citizenship and officialdom.

Jewish citizens of Frankfurt received full civil rights in 1864.

=== Reformed Church ===
Reformed Protestants from France and the Low Countries, in the 1550s reluctantly adopted in the free imperial city, were forbidden to profess their faith in 1561, but enjoyed unlimited staying permits, but not citizenship. A number of Reformed Frankfurters thus emigrated to the Palatinate where they founded the new city of Frankenthal in 1562. Others held Reformed ceremonies in their private homes.

By the 1590s more Reformed refugees were accepted in the city, but many emigrated later when they had found a better refuge. In 1601 the Reformed were allowed to maintain a chapel outside the city walls for their services, in return for allowing the Lutheran city council to veto their pastors. After that chapel had burnt down under unexplained circumstances in 1603, Reformed churchgoers could attend public Reformed service only abroad in the neighbouring Bockenheim, then County of Hanau.

After the Edict of Fontainebleau in 1685, tens of thousands of Huguenots had to leave Catholic France. The city allowed them using Frankfurt as a transit stop, with 26,000 refugees passing, on their ways to other states allowing their immigration. Only in 1787 the Lutheran council allowed the construction of, modest though, Reformed churches within the city, without tower and bells.

In 1820 about 2,000 members of the two congregations, the German Reformed Church and the French Reformed Church, joined to form a separate Protestant Reformed Consistory. After the Amendment Acts to the Constitution had been passed the Churches were forced to fund all costs of their religious cult as according to the treaties without competing with the city-aerarii. Consequently, they had no share in the endowment (Dotation) of 1830. In 1899 the Reformed and the Lutheran churches of Frankfurt merged into a Protestant regional church body of united administration (Evangelische Kirches im Konsitorialbezirk Frankfurt am Main), with each congregation maintaining its chosen confession. The two consistories were merged too.

=== City-owned dotation churches (Dotationskirchen) ===
Dotation churches for Lutheran service (since 1533)

1. Barfüßerkirche (Church of the Discalced), demolished in 1786 and replaced by the new Church of St. Paul's, inaugurated in 1833
2. St. Catherine's Church
3. St. Peter's Church, the city replaced the dilapidated old structure by a new church building in the 1890s
4. Weißfrauenkirche, city and congregation exchanged the old structure, destroyed by Allied bombing in 1944, by the former Dominican monastery church, also destroyed in 1944, previously in profane use by the city since the Reformation, and after reconstruction by the city renamed as Holy Spirit Church (Heilig-Geist-Kirche)
5. Three Wise Men's Church (Dreikönigskirche), the city replaced the dilapidated old structure by a new church building in the 1890s
6. Holy Spirit Church (old; Heiliggeistkirche), in 1840 city and congregation exchanged the old dilapidated structure, later torn down, by St. Nicholas Church

Dotation churches for Catholic service (since 1803)

1. Former Imperial Collegiate Church of St. Bartholomew's (colloquially called Dom, usually translated as cathedral)
2. Our Lady Church
3. St. Leonard's Church

== Foreign relations ==
The Free City of Frankfurt had diplomatic relationships with numerous European states as well as with the United States of America. The states of Baden, Bavaria, Belgium, Denmark, France, Great Britain, Hanover, Hesse-Darmstadt, Hesse-Kassel, Nassau, Austria, Prussia, Russia, Saxony, Sweden and Norway, the Kingdom of the Two Sicilies, the United States and Württemberg each had embassies and consulates in Frankfurt. The following states had a common delegation:

- Hohenzollern, Liechtenstein, Waldeck-Pyrmont, Reuß, Schaumburg-Lippe and Lippe,
- Mecklenburg,
- Oldenburg, Anhalt and Schwarzburg, along with
- the ducal and grand-ducal Saxon duchies.

== Military ==
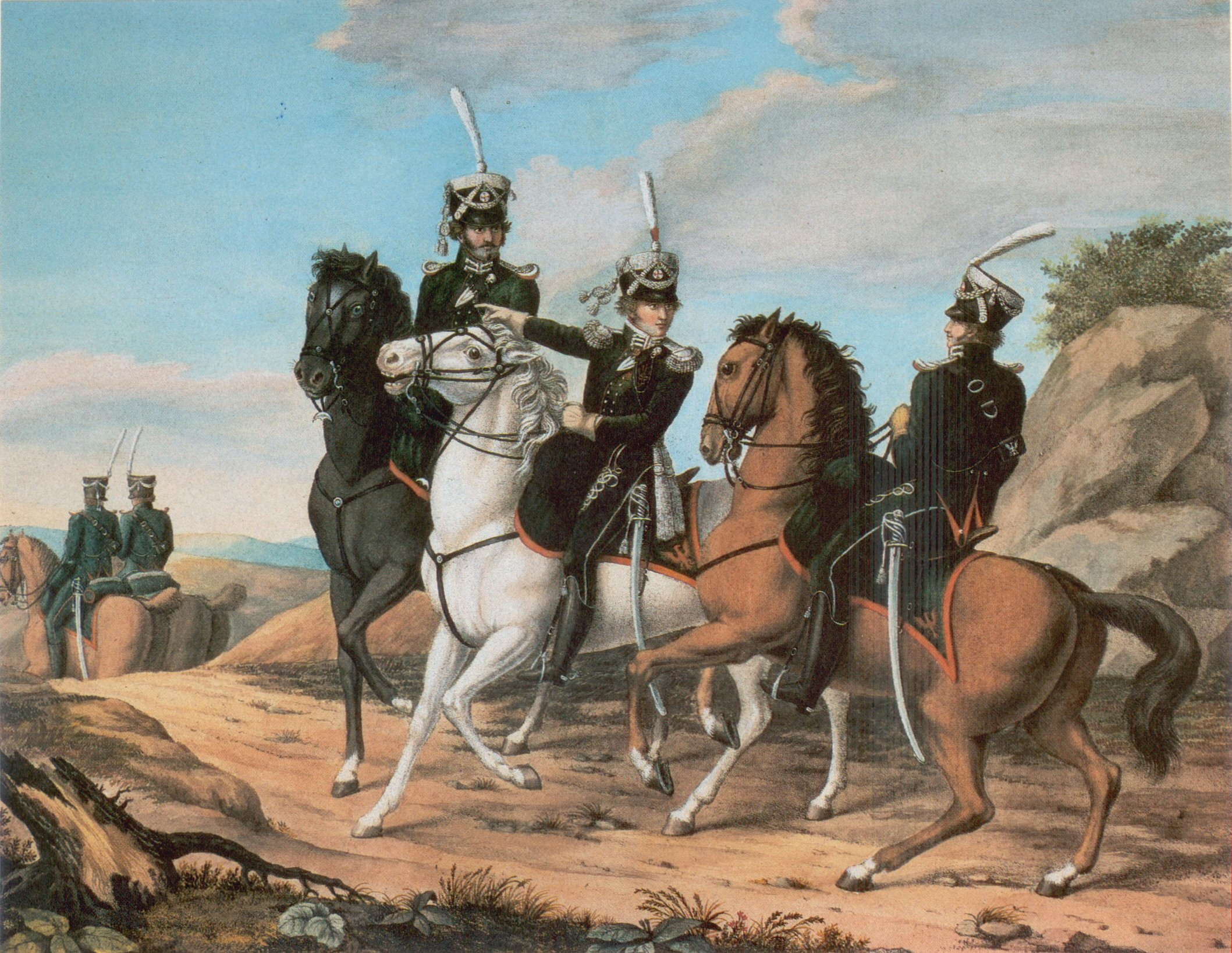
The voluntary citizens cavalry, German: freiwilliger Landsturm zu Pferde, was part of the Bürgerwehr, the citizens militia, founded in 1823. Historical Museum, Frankfurt

The military in the Free City of Frankfurt of which the city placed 579 men to the federal contingent, consisted of a 700-strong line battalion under the command of a lieutenant colonel. The line military consisted of mercenaries from southern Germany. Its six companies stayed in their barracks and guard rooms when Frankfurt was occupied on 16 July 1866. In the evening, the main guard passed on the line battalion to the Prussian Army with full military honors. Ten days later, on 26 July 1866, the battalion was dissolved after a last muster and the soldiers were released from duty. Depending on their term of service they received a gratuity between 50 and 250 guilders. Many of them let themselves be recruited by the French Foreign Legion afterwards.

== Currency and measuring units ==
=== Currency ===
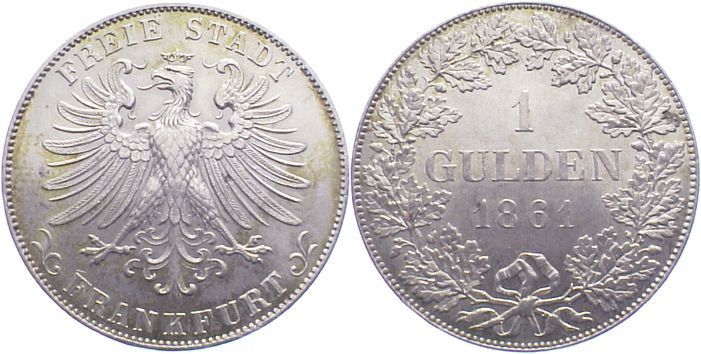
Frankfurter guilder coin minted in 1861

The most important currency in Frankfurt was the guilder (German: Gulden). It was a face-value coin whose mint price was defined as 24 guilders per Mark of silver since the Munich Coinage Treaty of 1837. Therefore, one guilder contained 9.545 grams of pure silver. The coins minted in Frankfurt featured the Eagle of Frankfurt on the one side and the label 1 Gulden (English: 1 guilder) with the year, surrounded by oak, on the other side. There were special issues, e.g. for Goethe's 100th birthday in 1849. On the edge of the coin, the text city's motto "Stark im Recht" was engraved.

The guilder was subdivided into 60 kreuzers. There were secondary coins worth one, three or six kreuzers as well as silver coins worth 12, 24 or 20 kreuzers. The Batzen was worth four kreuzers.

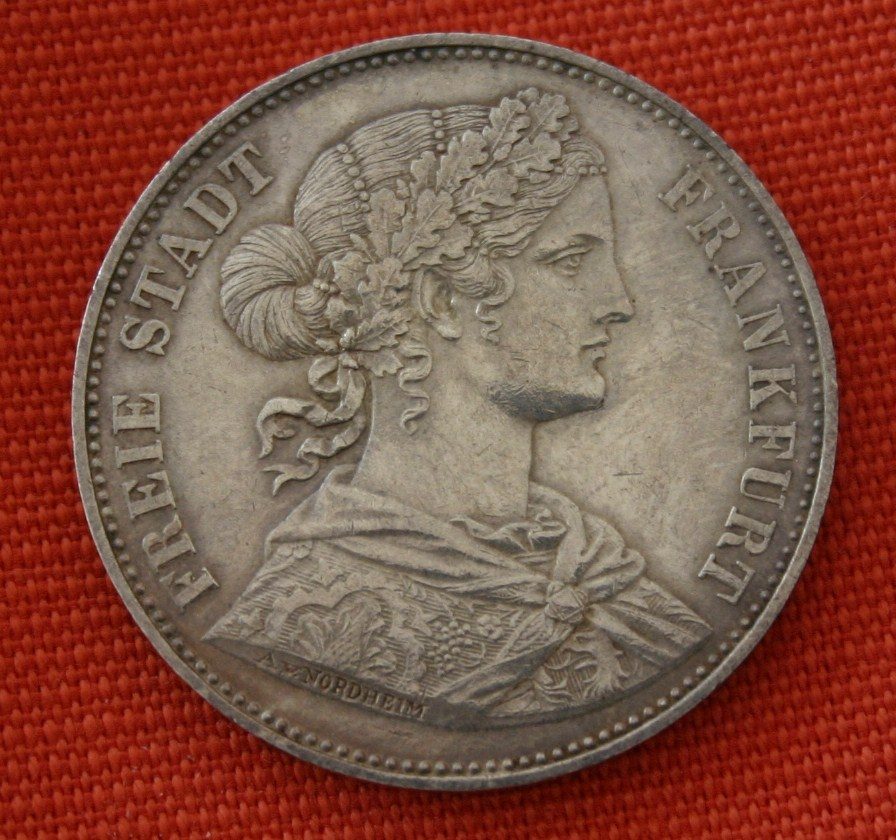
Vereinsthaler of 1865

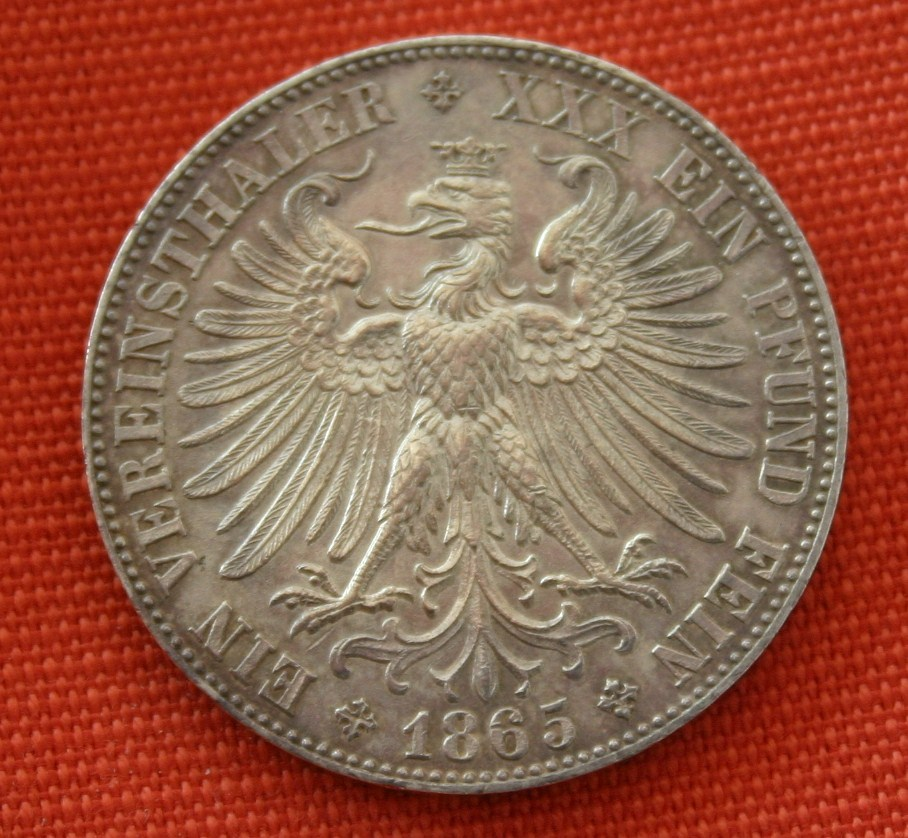
Reverse of the coin

Starting in 1857, vereinsthalers were minted with a mint price of 14 thalers per mark of silver or 16.69 grams of silver. Thus, 1.75 gulden were equal to 1 thaler. On the obverse, these coins featured the Francofurtia, an allegorical female figure designed by the sculptor August von Nordheim. Her model was supposed to be the actress Fanny Janauschek, on the one side. On the reverse, they showed the circular writing "Ein Vereinstaler – XXX ein Pfund fein". There were special issues of the thaler as well.

Due to the lack of a market basket, determining the exact buying power of the guilder is not possible. The pure silver value of the guilder would be about 3.65 euros. A comparison of buying powers based on data provided by the Hamburger Staatsarchiv and the Federal Statistical Office of Germany yielded a buying power of 16.50 euros in 1666.

=== Measurement units ===
The following units of measurement were common in the Free City of Frankfurt:

Frankfurter unit	subdivisions	metric unit
1 Werkschuh (Foot)	12 (inches) = 144 (lines)	0.2846 meters
1 ell		0.5623 meters
1 Außenstädtische Feldrute (outer city field rod)	12,5 feet	3.5576 meters
1 Außenstädtische Waldrute (outer city forest rod)		4.511 meters
1 Feldmorgen (field morgen)	160 square field rods	2025 square meters
1 Waldmorgen (forest morgen)	160 square forest rods	3256 square meters
1 Hube	30 field morgens	60.750 square meters
1 Ohm	20 Viertel (quarters) = 80 Maß = 90 Schenkmaß = 320 Schoppen	143.43 liters
1 Malter	4 Simmer = 8 Mesten = 16 Sechter = 256 Mäßchen (Diminutive of Maß)	114.73 liters
1 heavy pound (trader's pound, en gros)	1/100 hundredweight	505.34 grams
1 leichtes Pfund (grocer's pound, en detail)	2 marks = 16 ounces = 32 lots = 128 Quentchen = 256 Pfennig (pennies)	467.94 grams
1 hundredweight	100 heavy pounds = 108 light pounds	50.534 kilograms

=== Population ===
The Free City of Frankfurt and its suburban areas have displayed a steep population increase since the 1840s. This however, does not apply to the rural areas which have not been subject to considerable change.

Year	1837	1840	1843	1846	1849	1852	1855	1858	1861	1864
City Area	54.037	56.217	56.348	58.519	59.366	62.561	64.316	68.049	71.564	78.221
Suburban communities	6.296	6.562	6.630	6.860	7.052	7.587	7.522	8.254	8.880	9.866
Rural communities	2.818	2.743	2.853	2.861	2.936	3.002	2.946	2.975	2.946	3.063
Total territory	63.151	65.522	65.831	68.240	69.354	73.150	74.784	79.278	83.390	91.150

== See also ==
For almost five centuries, the German city of Frankfurt was a city-state within two major Germanic entities.

- The Holy Roman Empire as the Free Imperial City of Frankfurt (German: Freie Reichsstadt Frankfurt) (until 1806)
- The German Confederation as the Free City of Frankfurt (Freie Stadt Frankfurt) (1815–66)
