= Konrad Bethmann =

3 Kreuzer coin of 1670, similar to coins struck by Konrad Bethmann

Konrad Bethmann or Conrad Bethmann (1652–1701) was a German mint keeper and entrepreneur serving secular and ecclesiastical authorities.

== Life ==
He was born in Goslar as the seventh child of the merchant Andreas Bethmann, four years after the Peace of Westphalia ended the Thirty Years' War. Much of Germany then was a patchwork of small to medium-sized jurisdictions. While this factor impeded development towards a nation-state, it ensured plentiful opportunities for ambitious bureaucrats and entrepreneurs.

After leaving his hometown, he first became Münzwardein in Dömitz (Mecklenburg), then was appointed in 1683 Münzmeister to the Princess of Nassau-Holzappel in Cramberg on the Lahn river, followed by his appointment in 1687 as Münzmeister (Master of the Mint) to the Teutonic Knights in Friedberg, and in 1692 as Münzmeister for the Archbishopric/Electorate of Mainz in Aschaffenburg.

Among the oldest items pertaining to the Bethmann family in the (online) archives of the city of Frankfurt is the file of a criminal complaint brought by Konrad in 1685 while he was in the employ of the House of Nassau. Under the rubric "Jew v. Out-of-towner", the archive summarizes the case as follows:

Conrad Bethmann, master of the mint for the Princely House of Nassau-Schaumburg, versus Mencke and Abraham zum Hecht (father and son), for theft of Schaumburg hellers in Schwalbach near Königstein and resale of stolen property. Defendants claim to have acquired the stolen coins in good faith. Arrest of Abraham, release on posting of 304 Reichsthalers bond. Out-of-court settlement of Abraham with bursars of Nassau-Schaumburg.
Contains: Medical opinion on state of health of arrestee Abraham zum Hecht; Legal opinion of the jurists.

He bequeathed a substantial fortune on his widow Anna Elisabeth (1654–1727).

As a Protestant, Anna Elisabeth and her children left the Archbishopric behind for Lutheran Frankfurt am Main; there she found it easier to comply with her religious obligations and benefited from the presence of relatives. Three of Konrad and Anna Elisabeth's daughters married citizens of Frankfurt. Their son Simon Moritz Bethmann (1687–1725) was appointed an Amtmann ("chief administrator") in Bergnassau on the river Lahn.

Another son lies buried in the St. Lazarus cemetery of Regensburg. The inscription on his tombstone reads:

Reader!
Here you may seek what you do not find and find what you sought not. You sought a Coin and found more than a Coin: Dust, Earth and Ashes of a Well-Behaved Christian, namely the Former Well-born and Highly Educated Balthasar Johann Bethmann; having served as most meritorious Mining Counselor to His Princely Excellency the Governing Landgrave of Hessen-Darmstadt and as Minting Counsellor and General-Wardein to the most praiseworthy Upper-Rhenish district; born in the year of our Lord 1679 on the 12th of August in Braunschweig, having served with distinction as Müntz-Meister in Darmstadt from A.D. 1706 for 28 years, there elevated to Mining Counselor in A.D. 1734, co-opted by the Upper-Rhenish district to the office of Minting Commissioner ad comitia in A.D. 1737, and died blissfully in A.D. 1738 on the 26th of June, his age ripe with merit in his 59th year.
Now you know what Coin lieth in this Grave, what its content, value, face and lettering be. True, now it doth not shine: but go ye now and dwell happily in God.

== See also ==
- The Bethmann family

== Bibliography ==
- Claus Helbing: Die Bethmanns. Aus der Geschichte eines alten Handelshauses zu Frankfurt am Main, Gericke (publishers), Wiesbaden 1948.
- Wolfgang Klötzer (ed.): Frankfurter Biographie. Erster Band A-L, Frankfurt am Main, Waldemar Kramer (publishers), 1994, ISBN 3-7829-0444-3
