= Moritz von Bethmann =

German banker and nobleman

Moritz von Bethmann as seen by a caricaturist.

Philipp Heinrich Moritz Alexander von Bethmann (from 1854: Freiherr von Bethmann), born 8 October 1811 in Frankfurt am Main, died 2 December 1877 in Frankfurt am Main, was a German banker.

== Life ==
The oldest son of Simon Moritz von Bethmann (1768–1826) and Louise Friederike née Boode was only 15 years old when his father died. In 1833 he became the head of the Gebrüder Bethmann bank. Von Bethmann focused especially on railway construction. Together with the House of Rothschild, he established three railroad companies in succession: Taunus-Eisenbahn AG in 1836, Frankfurt-Hanauer Eisenbahn in 1844, and the Friedrich-Wilhelms-Nordbahn. In the 1850s he also invested in (among others) the Italian central railroad company, the Austrian state-controlled railroad company, and the Rhein-Nahe-Eisenbahn-Gesellschaft.

From 1854 until the loss of Frankfurt's status as a Free City in 1866, von Bethmann was the Prussian consul general in Frankfurt. In 1854 he was elevated to the status of a Freiherr in the Grand Duchy of Baden.

In 1863 he hosted the assembly of German princes in his garden house. Like his father before him, he generously contributed to philanthropic causes and to the arts in Frankfurt.

Von Bethmann, who had to cope with a lifelong handicap due to a hip impediment, was married to Maria née Freiin von Bose (1819–1882), with whom he had two sons and three daughters, among them Ludwig Simon Moritz Freiherr von Bethmann, who was named after his grandfather Simon Moritz and who would later take the reins as the head of the House of Bethmann.

== See also ==
- Bethmann family

== Bibliography ==
- Wolfgang Klötzer (ed.): Frankfurter Biographie. Vol. 1 A-L, Frankfurt am Main, Verlag Waldemar Kramer, 1994, ISBN 3-7829-0444-3
