= Bethmännchen =

German pastry

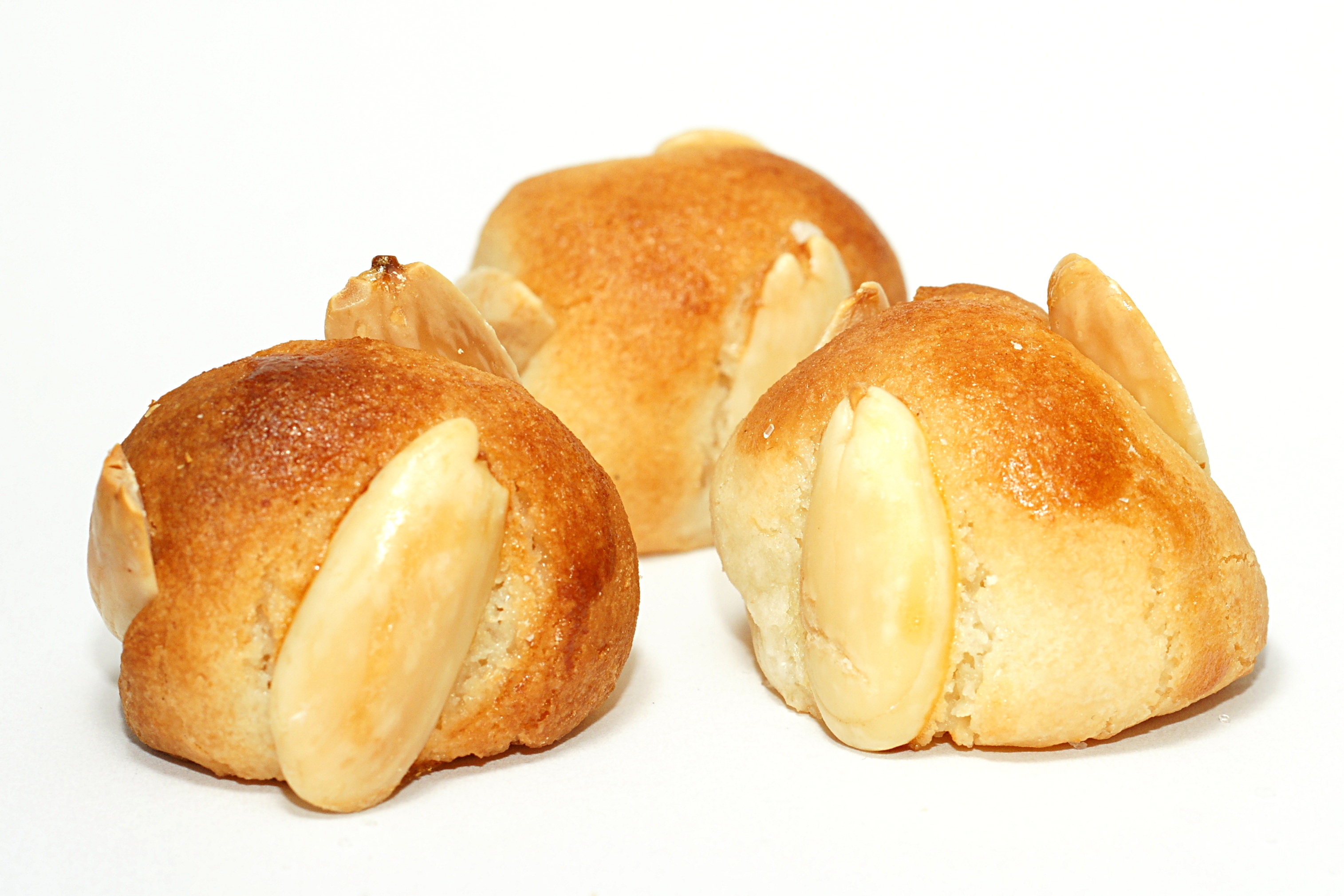
- Type: Pastry
- Place of origin: Germany
- Main ingredients: Marzipan, almonds, powdered sugar, rosewater, flour, eggs

Bethmännchen (German for "a little Bethmann") is a pastry made from marzipan with almond, powdered sugar, rosewater, flour and egg. It is a traditional cookie usually baked for Christmas Day and is widely available in chocolate shops around Frankfurt.

It is a special commodity sold in Frankfurt's Christmas market, one of the oldest Christmas markets in Germany which dates back as far as 1393.

== History ==
The name comes from the family of Bethmann. Legend has it that Parisian pastry chef Jean Jacques Gautenier developed the recipe for banker and city councilor Simon Moritz von Bethmann in 1838. Originally the Bethmännchen were decorated with four almonds, one for each son of Simon Moritz. After the death of his son Heinrich in 1845, the fourth almond was removed. However, this story is unlikely, since Simon Moritz had died already in 1826.

After one and a half centuries of manufacturing, its form and recipe has never been changed.

== See also ==
- List of almond dishes
- List of German desserts
- List of pastries
