= Bethmann family =

German banking family from Hesse

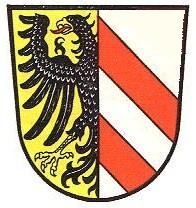
- Arms of the Bethmann family
- Current region: Hesse
- Etymology: Collector of voluntary taxes
- Origin: Goslar
- Titles: Freiherr von Bethmann
- Members: Konrad Bethmann; Johann Philipp Bethmann; Johann Jakob Bethmann; Simon Moritz Bethmann; Moritz von Bethmann
- Connected families: Bethmann-Hollweg

The Bethmann family (/ˈbɛtmɑːn/; BET-mahn) has been remarkable for the high proportion of its male members who succeeded at mercantile or financial endeavors. This family trait began in medieval northern Germany and continued with the Bethmann bank, which Johann Philipp Bethmann (1715–1793) and Simon Moritz Bethmann (1721–1782) founded in 1748 and soon catapulted into the foremost ranks of German and European banks. Even after the bank's sale in 1976, there are Bethmanns engaged in commercial real estate and forestry in the 21st century.

The most notable of the Bethmanns was Simon Moritz von Bethmann (1768–1826), a banker, diplomat, politician, philanthropist and patron of the arts. His sister Maria Elisabeth was the mother of Marie d'Agoult and the grandmother of Cosima Wagner; his sister Susanne Elisabeth was the great-grandmother of Theobald von Bethmann Hollweg, who was chancellor of Germany from 1909 to 1917.

== Beginnings in Goslar ==
The Bethmann family, which produced the famous Bethmann banking dynasty, resided in Frankfurt am Main from the early 18th century onward. Earlier ancestors had come from the northern German town of Goslar. There – as burghers but not feudal nobility – the Bethmanns were among the upper crust of urban families. As such, they were entitled to delegate representatives to the town council and to bear a coat of arms; the earliest mention of the Bethmann name in Hanseatic Goslar – in the registrum parochianorum, a compendium on wax tablets of the town's parishioners – dates back to a Heinrich Bethmann in 1416. The surname "Bethmann" likely was an occupational name (like "Bäcker"/"Baker") given to collectors of the bede penninc, a tax requested (erbeten) from freemen in the Middle Ages.

Subsequently, other Bethmanns – a Tile, a Bartold, a Hans and an Albrecht – appear in the records of Goslar, as owners of houses on Stonestrate and Korngasse, and as witnesses in the sale of houses. Another Tile buys a house on Knochenhauerstraße in 1492, serves on the town council, and is mentioned ten times between 1503 and 1520 as Munteherr, the title of an official responsible for minting of specie and weighing the metals produced from mining.

In 1512, Henning Bethmann, the great-great-grandfather of Konrad Bethmann, is accepted into the merchants' guild. In 1515, he is appointed Tafelherr, i.e. the councillor responsible for the town finances; this is followed by appointments to the posts of Munteherr in 1528, Kistenherr in 1538, and in 1548 supervisor of the vitriol works that extracted copper vitriol from ore. A Bartoldt Bethmann sold a house on Piepmäkerstraße in 1548 and another on Glockengießerstraße in 1566.

Henning's grandson Hieronymus is recorded in 1590 as a member of the merchants' guild; four years later, he married Ilsebey Drönewolf in St. Stephan's church. Hieronymus served as chairman of the merchants' guild, as Kornherr responsible for grain stocks, town councillor, member of the Sechsmann inner council and finally of the Neuer or governing council. Hieronymus died as the Swedes were entering Goslar. The town never fully recovered from the ransacking and pillaging of the Thirty Years' War, especially the three years of Swedish occupation.

Some of the 19th century literature incorrectly claimed that the family had originated in the Netherlands. The family assigned its archives in 1965 to the city of Frankfurt. The Bethmanns' archival materials occupy some 300 meters of shelf space, and the oldest document therein is a calligraphed agreement dated 29 May 1321, regulating traffic on the street between the Basler Hof property, which the Bethmanns purchased in 1762, and a neighboring house.

== Coat of arms ==
Coat of arms of Simon Moritz von Bethmann (1768–1826)

The Bethmann family's coat of arms can be traced to 1530. On the dexter side of a split shield, half an eagle in black is displayed against a golden background, while the sinister side displays two diagonal red bars against a silver background. At a later date, the motto tuebor (Latin for "I shall protect") was added.

== To Nassau and Aschaffenburg ==
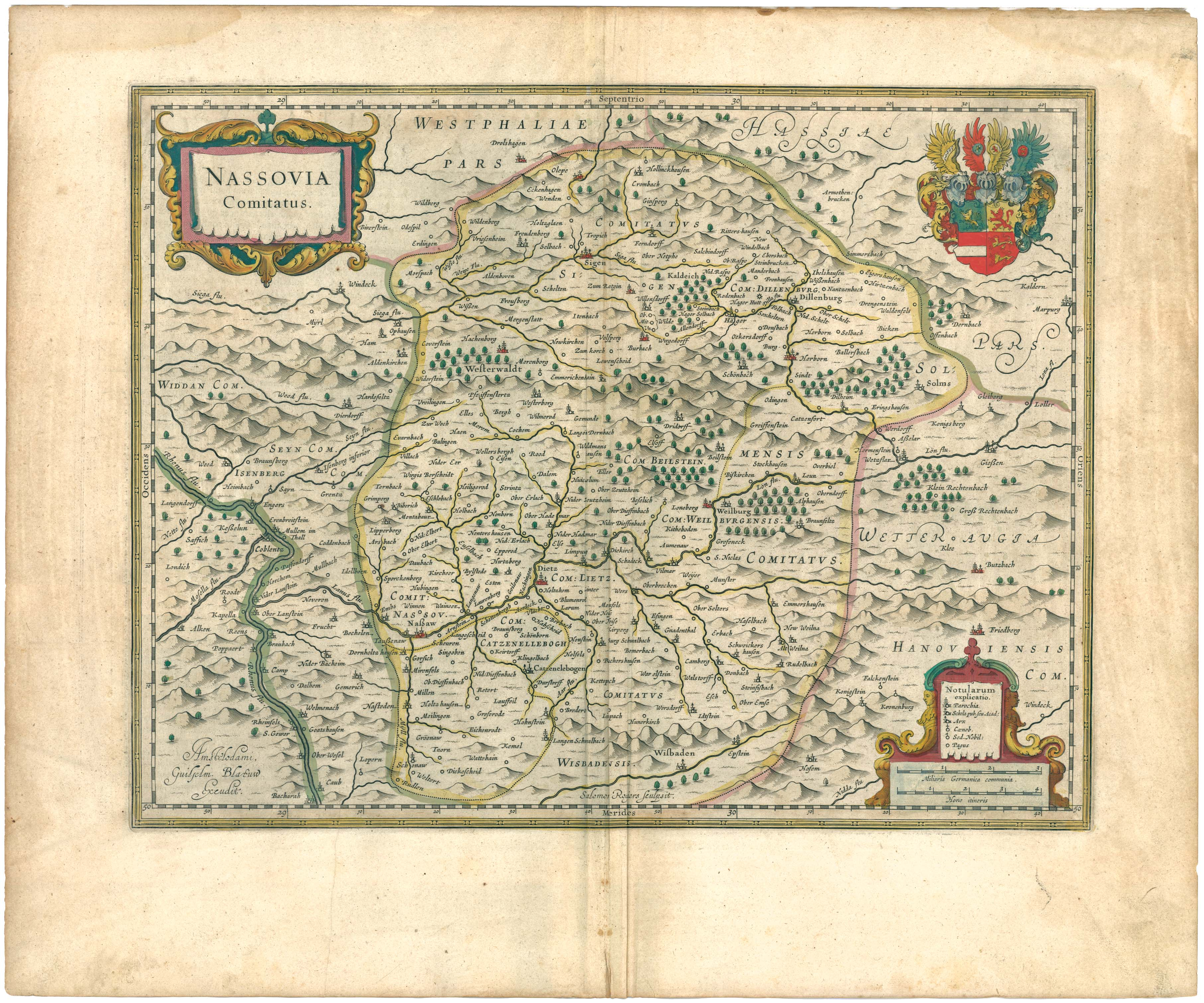
Map from 1645: Cramberg and Holzappel (not located on this map) are upriver from Naßaw on the Lahn river (Lohn flu[vius]) in the direction of Dietz. Königstein is outside of Nassovian territory to the southeast. Frankfurt would be in the far southeast corner. The Rhine is the broad river colored in green.

Konrad Bethmann (sometimes spelled "Conrad") (1652–1701) was born in Goslar as the seventh child of the merchant Andreas Bethmann, four years after the Peace of Westphalia ended the Thirty Years' War. Much of Germany then was a patchwork of small to medium-sized jurisdictions. While this factor impeded development towards a nation-state, it ensured plentiful job opportunities for ambitious bureaucrats and entrepreneurs.

Konrad left his hometown for an apprenticeship in Eisleben. He served as Münzwardein in Dömitz (Mecklenburg), then was appointed in 1683 Münzmeister to the Princess of Nassau-Holzappel in Cramberg on the Lahn river, followed by his appointment in 1687 as Münzmeister (Master of the Mint) to the Teutonic Knights in Friedberg, and in 1692 as Münzmeister for the Archbishopric and Electorate of Mainz in Aschaffenburg.

He bequeathed a substantial fortune to his widow, Anna Elisabeth (1654–1727), whom he had married in 1678. She was a native of the northern German town of Minden, where the church of St Simeon, Protestant since 1529, and the Roman Catholic monastery of St Maurice stand side by side to this day. This may explain why in subsequent generations, there was always one son named "Simon Moritz".

As a Protestant, the widowed Anna Elisabeth and her children left the Archbishopric for the Lutheran city of Frankfurt am Main; there she found it easier to comply with her religious obligations and benefited from the presence of relatives. Three of her daughters married citizens of Frankfurt. Her son Simon Moritz Bethmann (1687–1725) served the House of Nassau-Weilburg as an Amtmann or bailiff-magistrate, in Bergnassau on the river Lahn.

This Simon Moritz Bethmann had three sons:

1. Johann Philipp Bethmann (1715–1793),
2. Johann Jakob Bethmann (1717–1792) and
3. Simon Moritz Bethmann (1721–1782).

== Founding of the bank ==
Upon the death of Simon Moritz Bethmann in 1725, his widow Elisabeth Bethmann, formerly Thielen (1680–1757), returned to Frankfurt, where she became housekeeper in the household of her brother-in-law, the merchant Jakob Adami (1670–1745). In his will, he bequeathed to his nephews half of his fortune. Johann Philipp and Simon Moritz took control of the Jacob Adami trading enterprise, out of which in 1748 the banking enterprise of Gebrüder Bethmann developed. This eventually became the House of Bethmann. Johann Jakob – the middle brother – established a trading branch in Bordeaux. Later he became the imperial consul in Bordeaux and founded the Bordeaux branch of the family, which continues to this day.

Within a short span of time, the Bethmann bank developed into one of Frankfurt's leading Christian-owned banks, on a scale comparable only to its younger rival, the House of Rothschild. The bank's fortunes began to rise in 1754 based on its business in imperial, princely and municipal bonds and skyrocketed from 1778, thanks to the bank's innovation in breaking the amount borrowed by the Austrian emperor down into "sub-bonds" (Partialobligationen) at 1000 guldens each offered to the public, which made them tradeable in secondary markets. This transformed the bank from a lender to an underwriter of bond issues. At one point, the profits of Gebrüder Bethmann exceeded those of all its Frankfurt competitors put together, and it ranked first among all German banks.

Simon Moritz, a major donor to Frankfurt's Citizens' Hospital, died without issue, but the marriage in 1762 between his elder brother Johann Philipp and Katharina Margarethe Schaaf (1741–1822), daughter of the Frankfurt notable Anton Schaaf, produced six children, four of whom survived to adulthood:

1. Susanne Elisabeth (1763–1833) was married in 1780 to the Frankfurt merchant Johann Jakob Hollweg (1748–1808), who changed his name to Bethmann-Hollweg upon marriage. Her son Moritz August would become a Prussian minister of state, and his grandson in turn was Theobald von Bethmann Hollweg, who served as Imperial German Chancellor from 1909 to 1917.
2. Simon Moritz (1768–1826) was among the most notable of Frankfurt's bankers, statesmen and philanthropists.
3. Maria Elisabeth (1772–1847) was married in 1790 to the banker Johann Jakob Bußmann (1756–1791). Widowed only a year later, she remarried, this time to émigré French aristocrat Alexandre Victor Francois Vicomte de Flavigny (1770–1819). Her daughter from the second marriage was Marie d'Agoult (1805–1876), who in turn gave birth to several children, among them—from her liaison to Franz Liszt –- Cosima Wagner (1837–1930).
4. Sophie Elisabeth (1774–1862).

== First families of Frankfurt ==
In Frankfurt, the beginnings of an independent polity date back to the grant of privileges to its citizens by Holy Roman Emperor Friedrich II in 1217. Not long after, an upper crust of burgher families began to constitute itself. To them were reserved seats on the town council, which were passed on by inheritance to the sons of the council members. This clique of generally wealthy families was called Patricians, after the patricii ruling families of ancient Rome. Some of these patrician families, like the Holzhausens, had an unbroken run of sixteen generations on the town council from the 13th to the 18th century. As the daughter of a Kaiserlicher Rat and Schöffe, Katharina Margarete Schaaf gained her husband Johann Philipp access to Patrician society; she was on familiar terms with the mother of Goethe and, even after she was widowed, maintained a respected salon where she received Madame de Staël in 1808.

By 1816, when Frankfurt's new constitution abolished the privilege of heritable office for the Patrizier, the cachet of belonging to one of their societies had already become much less significant.

== A man in full – pragmatic and enlightened ==
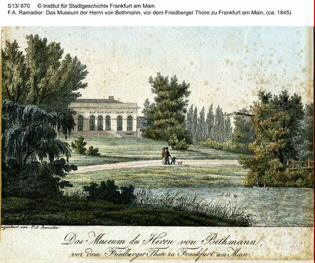
View of Bethmann museum (opened 1812). Reproduction of 1845 hand-colored woodcut by French artist F.A. Ramadier.

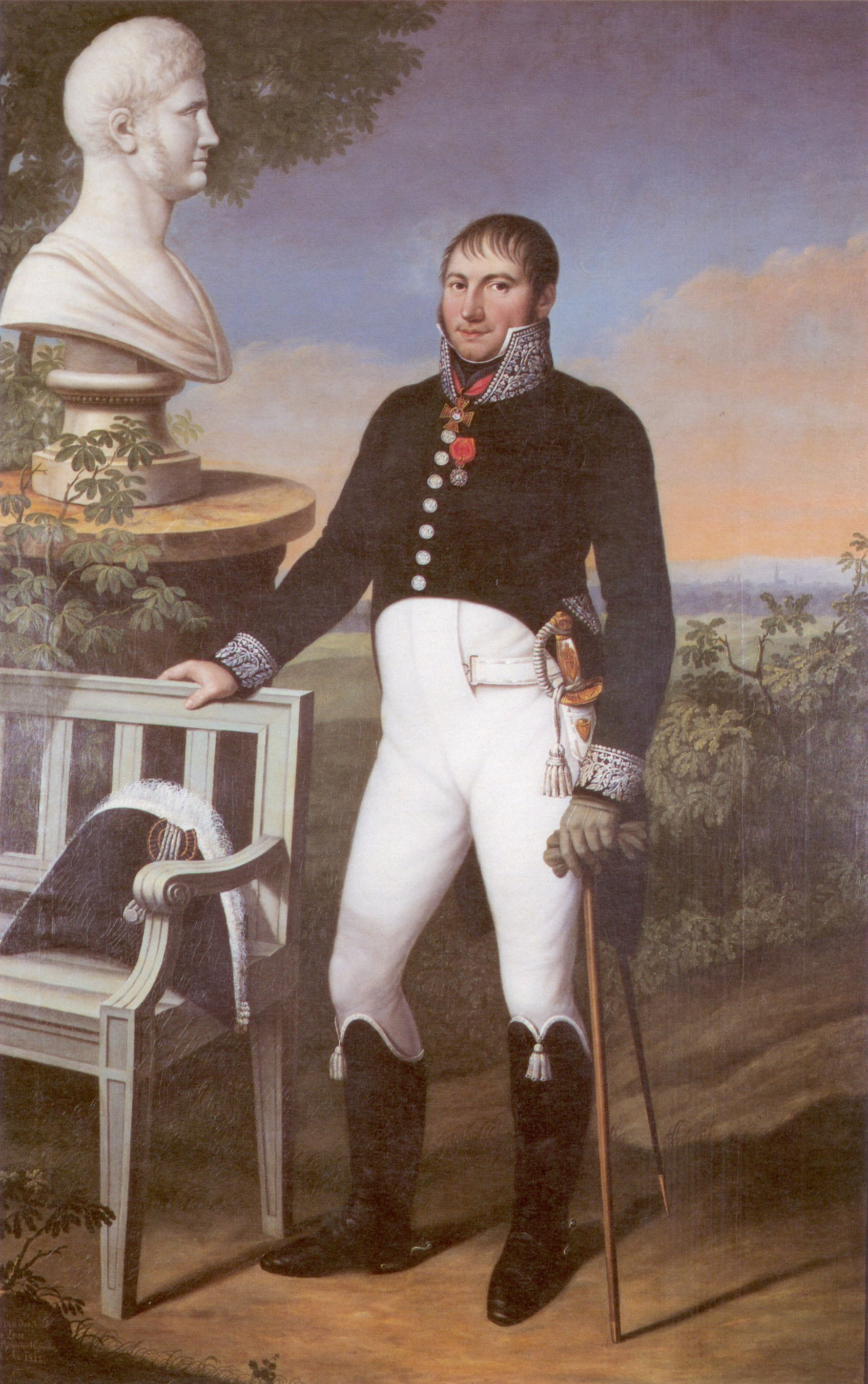
Oil painting by Johann Jakob de Lose, 1812, of Simon Moritz von Bethmann, posing before a bust of tsar Alexander I and adorned with the Russian order of Vladimir and St. Anna.

Upon the death of Johann Philipp Bethmann in 1793, his son Simon Moritz became head of the House of Bethmann. His peers called him "Frankfurt's premier citizen", while in France some called him le roi de Francfort. His financial dealings gained him entrance to nearly all the ruling families of Europe, and he exploited these contacts on numerous diplomatic missions on behalf of his hometown. In 1802 he negotiated successfully with France for a reduction of her demand for contributions to the cost of war. In the negotiations on the German mediatisation, he bargained for and achieved the secularization of ecclesiastical assets within the territory of Frankfurt for the benefit of the imperial city. In 1802 he was appointed Russian consul for Frankfurt, followed by his appointment in 1807 as Russian Consul General and Staatsrat or Russian Counselor of State. In 1808 he received the patent of an Austrian nobleman from Francis I, Emperor of Austria. Thenceforth, he and his descendants would be named von Bethmann. However, to the people of Frankfurt his "Russian" title of Staatsrat stuck, and so even after he returned that commission to Tsar Alexander I he was simply known as the Staatsrat. On 31 October 1813 the retreating Emperor Napoleon spent the night as an unannounced guest at the Bethmanns' garden house. Bethmann's negotiating skills managed to persuade the French to withdraw their army without further bloodshed from Frankfurt.

Besides promoting commerce, Simon Moritz von Bethmann was an ardent supporter of the arts and sciences in the city of Frankfurt. In 1812 Bethmann inaugurated a museum of antique and classicist sculpture within a stretch of land that he had turned into a park six years earlier. (Both the building and the park were sold to the city in 1856). His donations made it possible to establish the city library on the northern bank of the river Main between 1820 and 1825.

He was a major donor and co-founder of secondary schools (Musterschule in 1803, Philanthropin in 1804, Weißfrauenschule in 1806); his efforts on behalf of the Philanthropin were particularly noteworthy, for in supporting this Jewish school and promoting its cause among his Christian brethren, Simon Moritz was ahead of his time. In 1687 when Anna Elisabeth Bethmann named a son Simon Moritz, it may have been that she wanted to show her support for ecumenicism or it may simply have been that she fondly remembered the twin landmarks of her hometown. For her great-grandson—the third Simon Moritz—there was nothing accidental about what he set out to do: support the Jews in their struggle for civil rights.

In this respect, Simon Moritz was not unique. A generation earlier, Enlightenment figures like Gotthold Ephraim Lessing had begun militating for Jewish emancipation. Unusually, however, at the same time that Simon Moritz was helping the Jews of Frankfurt to secure greater freedoms for themselves, he was carrying on a fierce business rivalry with the Rothschilds in which no quarter was ever given.

On Christmas Day 1826, he suffered a stroke in a box seat of Frankfurt's municipal theater, an institution which he had co-endowed, and succumbed two days afterward. Bethmann was buried in the cemetery of the Church of Peter in Frankfurt, where his grave is preserved to this day.

Simon Moritz von Bethmann had married Louise Friederike née Boode (1792–1869), daughter of a respected Dutch family, granddaughter of a Huguenot named Martin and a native of British Guiana, in 1810. The Louisa park off a major carriage route in the southwest part of Frankfurt is named after Louise von Bethmann.

Four sons issued from this marriage:

1. Philipp Heinrich Moritz Alexander von Bethmann (1811–1877)
2. Carl Ludwig Caesar von Bethmann (1812–1871)
3. Alexander von Bethmann (1814–1883)
4. Jacob Heinrich Friedrich von Bethmann (d. 1845 without issue)

Because Bethmann's sons had not yet achieved the age of majority upon their father's death, the bank's partners stepped in as pro tem directors of the bank. In 182,8 his widow remarried to Matthias Franz Joseph Borgnis (1798–1867).

== Magnates of industrial revolution ==
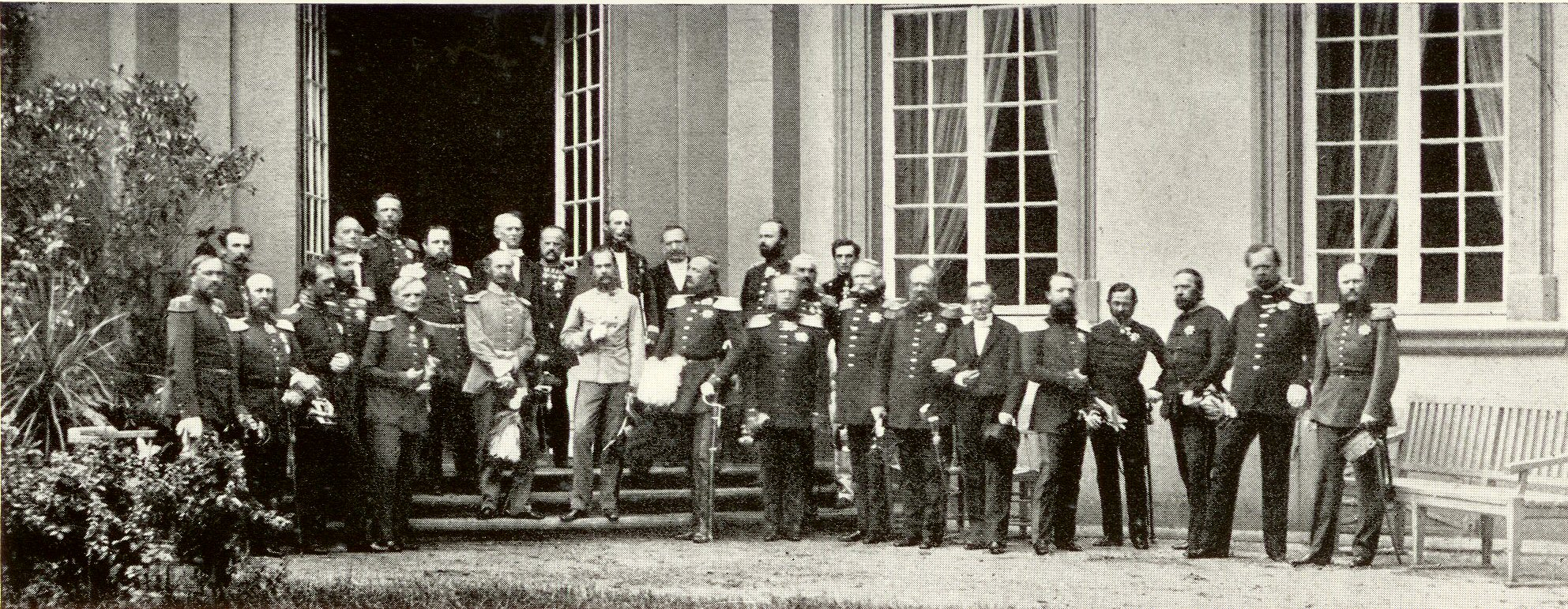
Assembly of German princes in Frankfurt on August 18, 1863

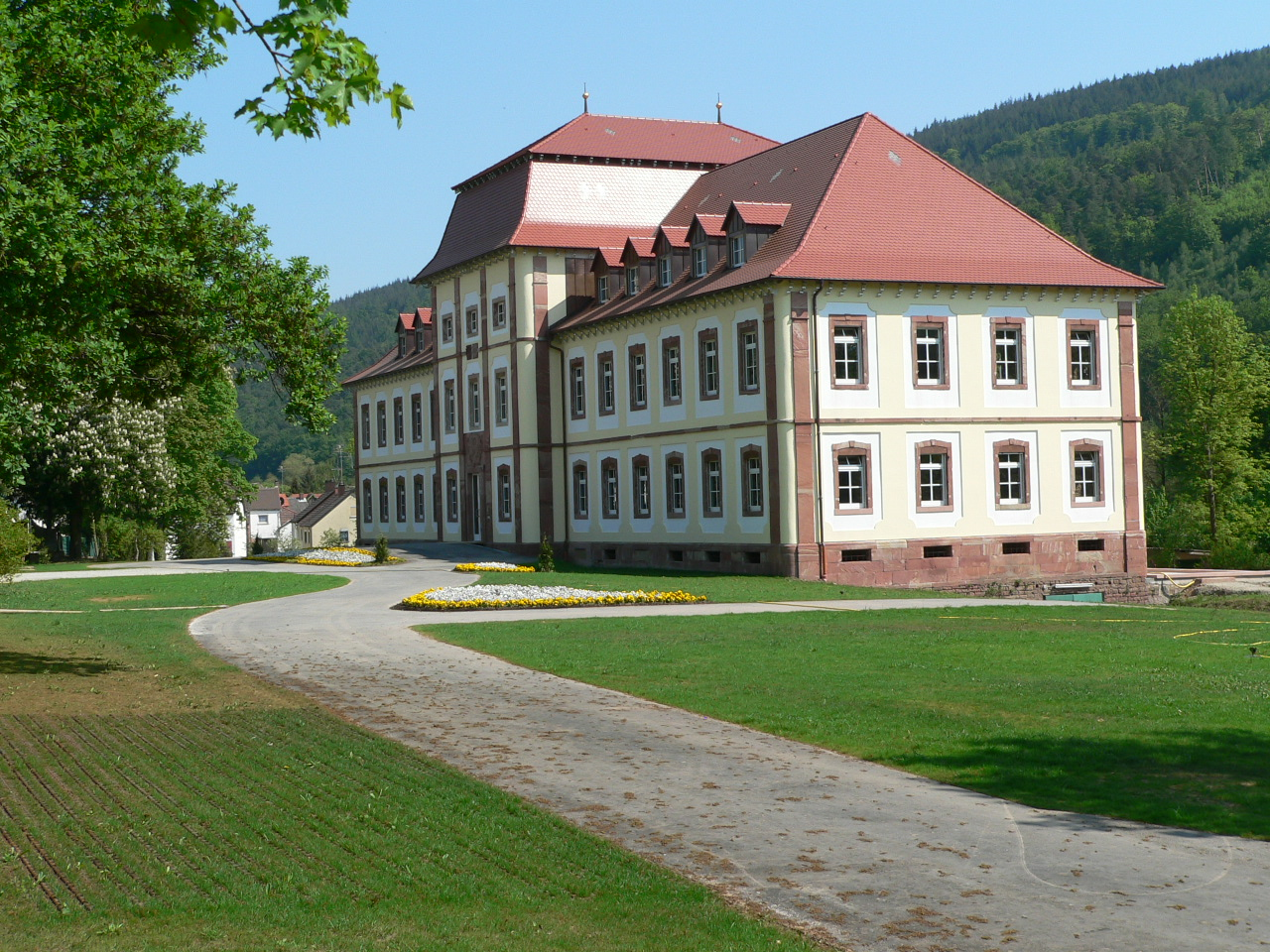
Fechenbach castle

In 1833, Moritz von Bethmann succeeded to the directorship of the bank. He financed the construction of numerous railways in Germany and made especially sure that Frankfurt turned into an early node of rail traffic. Together with M. A. Rothschild & Söhne, Moritz started the Taunus-Eisenbahn AG in 1836, the Frankfurt-Hanau railroad in 1844, and the Rheingau railroad in 1845, to name just a selection. Investments were made during the 1850s in other European railroads – such as the Italian Central Railroad, the Austrian state railroad, and the Rhine/Nahe railroad established in 1856. In 1842 he became a Prussian consul, then Prussian Consul General in the Free City of Frankfurt from 1854 to 1866. He was granted the heritable title of Freiherr, a rank of minor nobility, in the Grand Duchy of Baden in 1854. Also in 1854 he co-founded the Frankfurter Bank, in 1862 the Frankfurter Hypothekenbank, and in 1873 the Degussa company.

In 1863, he hosted the German princes convening to discuss constitutional reform in his garden mansion. Following in the footsteps of his father, he too was a generous patron of the arts in Frankfurt and contributed heavily to philanthropic causes, arts and letters, and organized equestrian activities. On 18 September 1848, he gave refuge to mortally wounded Prince Felix Lichnowsky who had been attacked by a mob ostensibly outraged over foreign policy decisions. He was married to Marie von Bose.

Moritz' brother Carl Ludwig Caesar von Bethmann purchased the castle of Fechenbach in 1842, earning him the title of a Bavarian Freiherr. His oldest son Karl Moritz "Charly" von Bethmann proved a spendthrift and got himself in hock to a loan shark charging 6 per cent interest a week. Karl Moritz was hoping for a rescue from the House of Bethmann, but Moritz von Bethmann was unfazed: he said that total ruination was the best cure for his profligate nephew Charly.

The last male descendant of this line, Karl Alexander Moritz Freiherr von Bethmann, died in 1942. Fechenbach castle was sold to a private buyer named Wissler but confiscated by the Nazis a year later. Following the end of WWII and after a decade as an orphanage, the property was restituted to the Wissler family, who completed its construction in 2006.

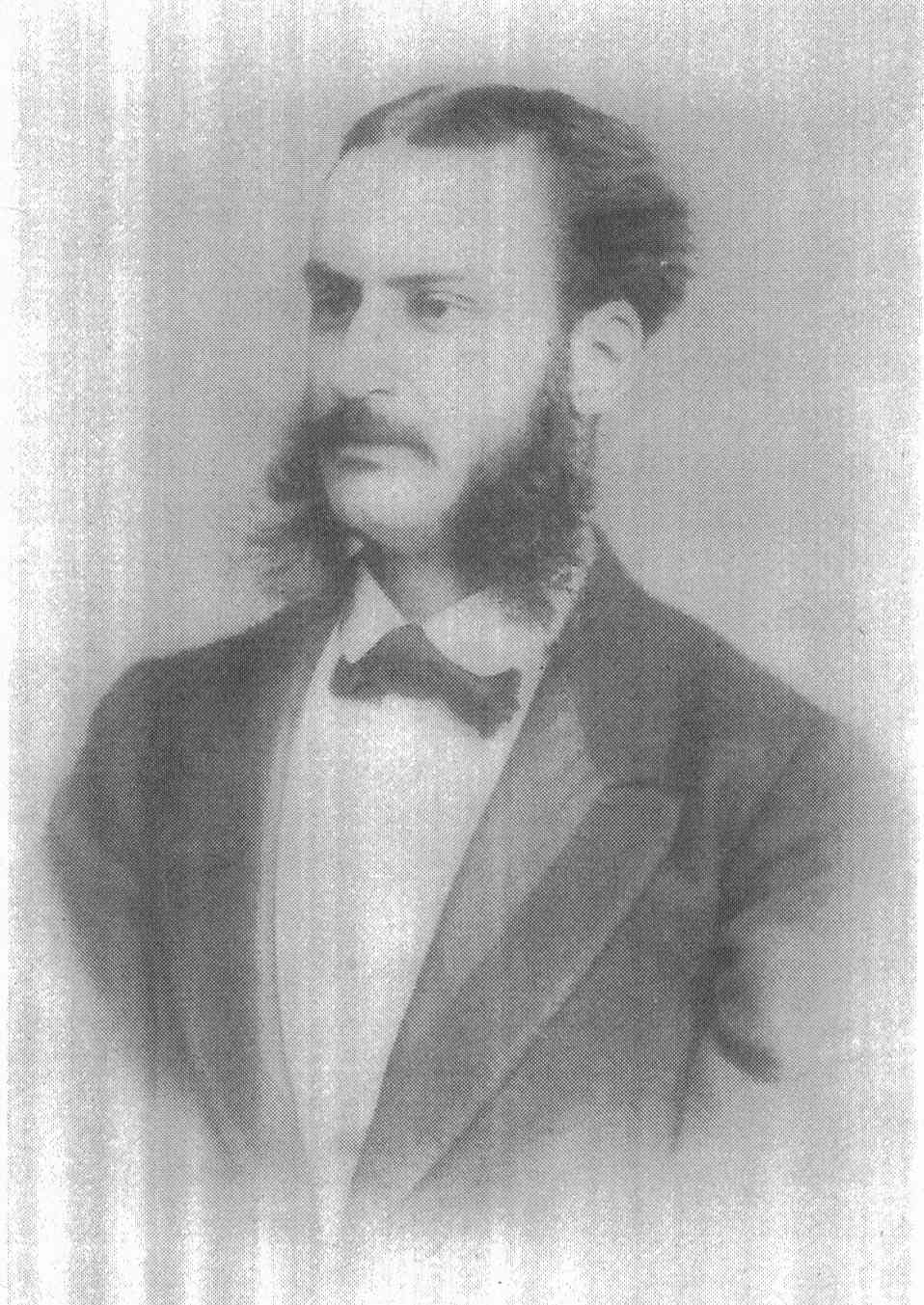
Simon Moritz Freiherr von Bethmann (1844–1902)

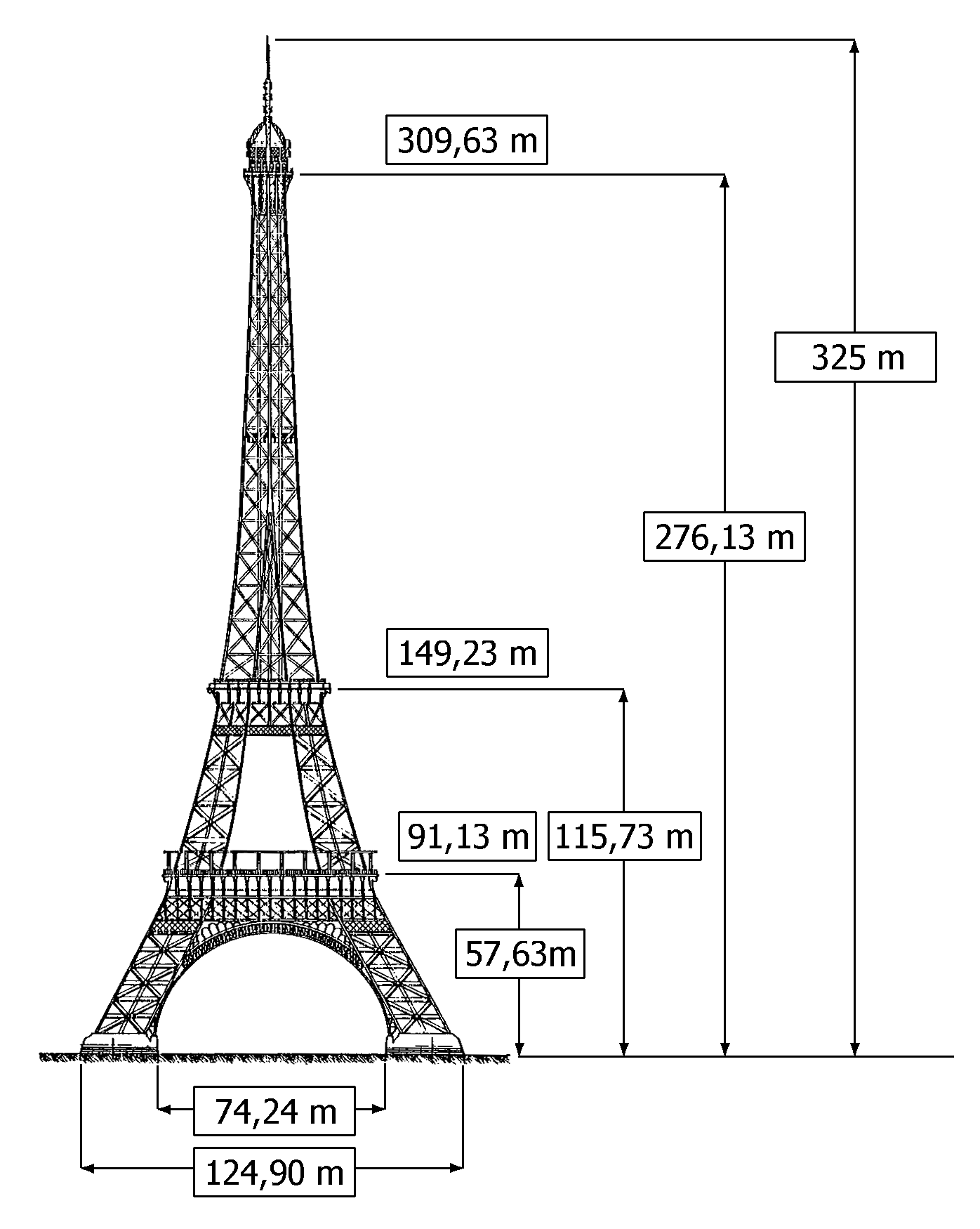
The Eiffel Tower in Paris (construction 1887–89), a venture co-financed by Gebrüder Bethmann

Ludwig Simon Moritz Freiherr von Bethmann (1844–1902), the eldest son of Moritz von Bethmann and Marie von Bose, married Baroness Helene von Wendland. Trained in London, he joined Gebrüder Bethmann as partner in 1869. He gained broad experience in several industries, serving as non-executive director on the boards of rail and banking companies. This Simon Moritz kept up the railroad business but also got the bank involved in municipal bonds and industrial investments worldwide. A passionate huntsman and athlete, he became a wheelchair user following a riding accident in 1879. He gave generously to local and charitable causes, sponsoring the Golden Book of Frankfurt am Main in 1902. Of their three children, only Simon Moritz survived. After serving as First Lieutenant in World War I, he set out to transform the Bethmann bank into a full-service bank.

Simon Moritz Henning August Freiherr von Bethmann (1887–1966): following studies of the law in Lausanne and Leipzig, he joined Gebrüder Bethmann as partner in 1913. In 1914, he married Maximiliane Countess Schimmelpenninck, a granddaughter of Dr. Eugen Lucius, a founder of Hoechst AG, thus adding the landed estate with Castle Schönstadt near Marburg to the Bethmann holdings. He joined the board of the stock exchange and became its president in 1933.

This Simon Moritz contributed his time to numerous cultural institutions of Frankfurt, such as the administration of the Städel museum, as well as non-profit foundations. He co-founded the first Rotary Club in Frankfurt and accepted an appointment as Swedish Consul General. In 1929, he served as chairman of the supervisory board of Frankfurter Bank. When World War II ended, he was a lieutenant colonel (reserve).

== Gadfly author and last of the bankers ==
- Johann Philipp Freiherr von Bethmann (1924–2007)
  - "Zu wenig studiert: Privatbankier von Bethmann empfiehlt der Bundesbank ein unorthodoxes Rezept gegen die Inflation: Die Zinsen müssen runter". spiegel.de.
- Albrecht Freiherr von Bethmann (born 1956) – commercial real estate
- Christian Freiherr von Bethmann (born 1958) – forestry owner and consultant, and commercial real estate

== Eponymous sites, Bethmännchen ==
In Frankfurt, the Bethmann family name is honored in Bethmannstraße, a short street in Frankfurt's old part of town; the Bethmann park in Frankfurt's Nordend district; and the Bethmannschule, a vocational school for office careers. A statue of Simon Moritz von Bethmann by sculptor Eduard Schmidt von der Launitz was erected on the centenary of his birth in the Friedberger Anlage, a landscaped portion of the razed city ramparts.

According to a popular story, the Bethmännchen, a marzipan confection, was created in 1838 by the Paris pastry chef Jean Jacques Gautenier, then the head cuisinier in the Bethmann household. The four almond halves stuck onto the Bethmännchen were said to represent each one of the four sons, with one of the four almond pieces left off following the death of Heinrich in 1845.

== Bibliography ==
- Herders Conversations-Lexikon, vol. 1. Freiburg im Breisgau 1854
- Neues deutsches Adels-Lexicon, Ernst Heinrich Kneschke (ed.), vol. 1. Leipzig 1859
- Allgemeine deutsche Biographie, vol. 2, Leipzig 1875
- Die Grenzboten: Zeitschrift für Politik, Literatur und Kunst, F. L. Herbig (publisher), 1878
- Brockhaus' Konversationslexikon, Leipzig, Berlin and Vienna, 14th edition 1894–1896
- Paul Joseph, Eduard Fellner: Die Münzen von Frankfurt am Main nebst einer münzgeschichtlichen Einleitung und mehreren Anhängen, 1896 (in German)
- Meyers Großes Konversations-Lexikon, vol. 2, Leipzig 1905
- Claus Helbing: Die Bethmanns. Aus der Geschichte eines alten Handelshauses zu Frankfurt am Main. Gericke, Wiesbaden 1948. (in German)
- Alexander Dietz: Frankfurter Handelsgeschichte, Glashütten 1971, reprint of 1925 edition (in German)
- Fritz Stern: Gold and Iron. Vintage, 1979, ISBN 978-0-394-74034-8 (in English)
- Wolfgang Klötzer: Das Familienarchiv der Bethmanns, in: Wahrlich eine schöne Stadt. Kleine Schriften zur Frankfurter (in German) Kulturgeschichte, Verlag Waldemar Kramer (publishers), Frankfurt am Main, 1985, ISBN 3-7829-0300-5 (in German)
- Erich Pfeiffer-Belli: Junge Jahre im alten Frankfurt, Wiesbaden and Munich, 1986, ISBN 3-8090-2240-3 (in German)
- Wolfgang Klötzer (ed.): Frankfurter Biographie. Erster Band A-L. Verlag Waldemar Kramer, Frankfurt am Main 1994, ISBN 3-7829-0444-3 (in German)
- Hans Sarkowicz (ed.): Die großen Frankfurter, Frankfurt am Main and Leipzig, 1994, ISBN 3-458-16561-4 (in German)
- Ralf Roth: Stadt und Bürgertum in Frankfurt am Main, doctoral thesis, University of Frankfurt am Main, 1996 (in German)
- Christine Magin: Die Inschriften der Stadt Goslar, L. Reichert (publishers), 1997, ISBN 978-3-89500-040-9 (in German)
- Carl-Ludwig Holtfrerich: Frankfurt as a Financial Center: From Medieval Trade Fair to European Banking Centre, Munich, 1999, ISBN 3-406-45671-5, Google Books Preview (in English)
- Niall Ferguson: The House of Rothschild. Volume 1, Money's Prophets: 1798–1848. Penguin, 1999, ISBN 978-0-14-024084-9 (in English)
- Patrick Hanks (ed.): Dictionary of American Family Names. Oxford University Press, 2006, ISBN 978-0-19-516557-9 (in English)
