= Johann Jakob Bethmann =

German merchant and shipowner

Johann Jakob Bethmann (from 1776: von Bethmann; also known as Jean-Jacob de Bethmann; 20 June 1717 – 2 September 1792) was a German merchant and shipowner.

== Life ==
Johann Jakob was born in Bergnassau, one of three sons of the administrator Simon Moritz Bethmann (1687–1725). After the premature death of their father, the brothers were raised by their maternal uncle Jakob Adami in Frankfurt am Main. While the brothers Johann Philipp and Simon Moritz established the Gebrüder Bethmann bank based on their uncle's inheritance, Johann Jakob moved to Bordeaux in 1740, where he established Bethmann & Imbert (since 1779 Bethmann & fils) as a trading enterprise and shipowning company.

In 1745 Bethmann married the Protestant Elisabeth Desclaux (1725–1785), a Bordeaux native. In 1749 he took Swiss citizenship and in 1758 he became a citizen of Frankfurt am Main. In 1768 he was appointed imperial consul for Bordeaux, and in 1776 he was knighted.

Bethmann proved an astute businessman and prospered quickly. Besides trading in goods and merchandise, he was not averse to an engagement in the slave trade and had already secured a guaranty worth 300,000 livres from his brothers in Frankfurt for that purpose before the plan for a joint venture with the Danish West India and Guinea Company was aborted due to business uncertainty.

He left his daughter Katharina Elisabeth (1753–1813) in the care of his childless brother Simon Moritz in Frankfurt. There she married in 1769 the merchant Peter Heinrich Metzler (1744–1800), who thenceforth used the surname Bethmann-Metzler (subsequently von Bethmann-Metzler or de Bethmann-Metzler) but remained in Frankfurt as a partner in the bank.

After Johann Jakob's death in Bordeaux, his Frankfurt grandchildren returned to the city.

Johann Jakob Bethmann was a friend of German author Friedrich Melchior Grimm.

== See also ==
- Bethmann family

== Bibliography ==
- Wolfgang Henninger: Johann Jakob von Bethmann 1717–1792. Kaufmann, Reeder und kaiserlicher Konsul in Bordeaux, 2 volumes, Bochum 1993 ISBN 3-8196-0104-X
- --: Grimms Freund aus Bordeaux. Johann Jakob von Bethmann (1717–1792); in: J. Mondot / C. L'Arriere (ed.), Lumières et commerce. L'example bordelais; (=Obras Generales 61); 2000
- Wilhelm Stricker: Bethmann, Johann Jakob. In: Allgemeine Deutsche Biographie (ADB). Vol. 2, Duncker & Humblot, Leipzig 1875, p. 574–576.
- Klaus Weber: Deutsche Kaufleute im Atlantikhandel, 1680–1830. C.H.Beck, Munich 2004 ISBN 3-406-51860-5, ISBN 978-3-406-51860-7
