= Bettman =

Bettman or Bettmann is a German Jewish surname meaning "mattress maker" or "mattress seller". Another variant is Bethmann. Notable people with the surname include:

- Alfred Bettman (1873–1945), American urban planner
- Gary Bettman (born 1952), American sports executive
- Gilbert Bettman (1881–1942), American politician
- Otto Bettmann (1903–1998), German and American archivist; founder of the Bettmann archive
- Siegfried Bettmann (1863–1951), Anglo-German cycle and motor vehicle manufacturer

== See also ==
- Bettman Preserve, a park in Cincinnati, Ohio, United States
