= Johann Philipp Bethmann =

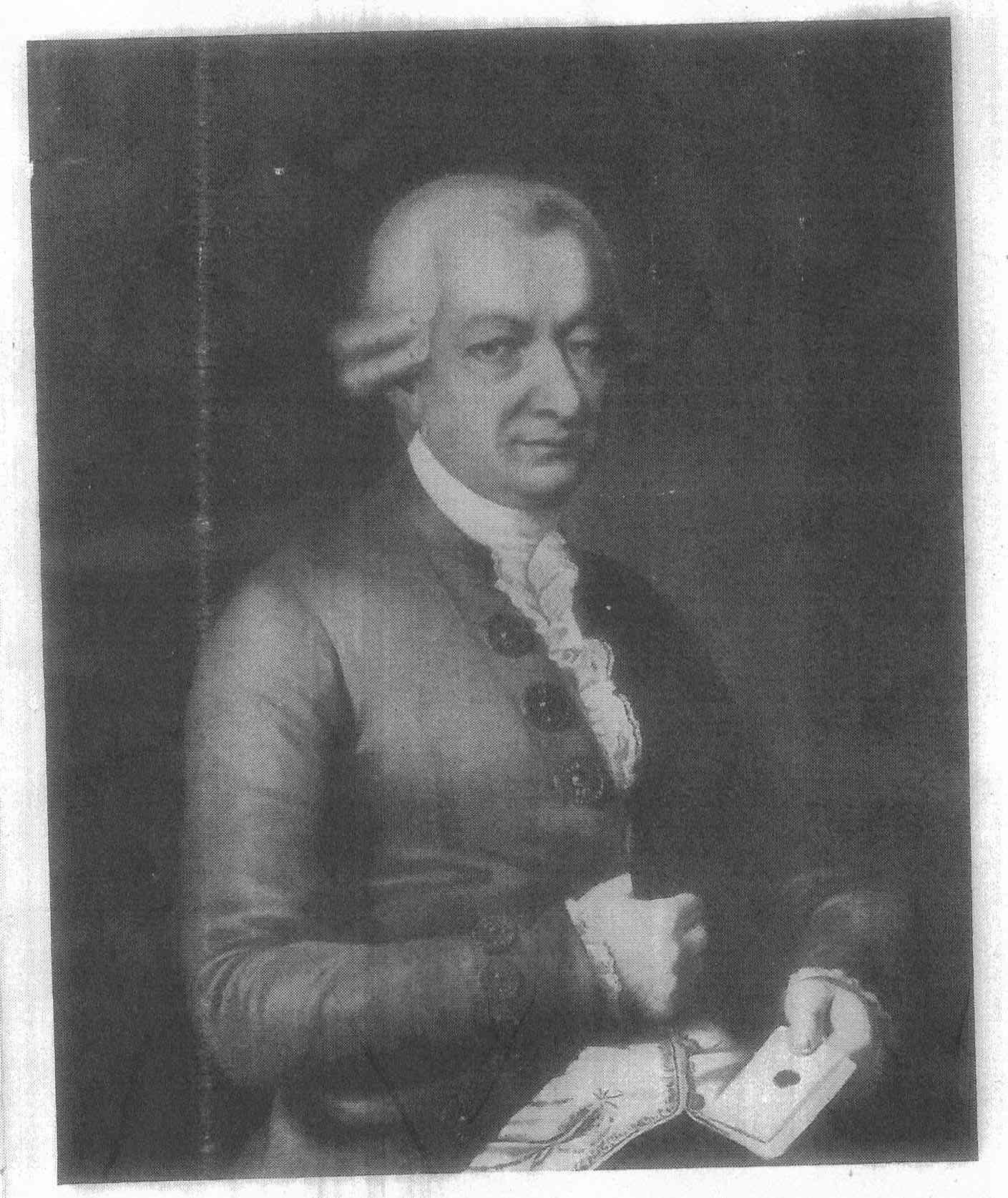
Johann Philipp Bethmann (1715-1793)

Johann Philipp Bethmann (30 November 1715 in Nassau, northwest of Frankfurt am Main – 27 November 1793 in Frankfurt am Main) was a German merchant and banker.

== Life ==
Bethmann was the oldest son of the Nassovian administrator Simon Moritz Bethmann (1687–1725). Johann Philipp apprenticed in a trading enterprise in Leipzig from 1730 to 1735, then worked in Nantes and later for his uncle Jakob Adami. In 1746 he and his youngest brother Simon Moritz each paid 800 guldens to purchase citizenship in Frankfurt. Their brother Johann Jakob carried on the family name in Bordeaux, where he became a merchant and shipowner.

Following the death of their uncle in 1745 the brothers inherited half of his fortune. In 1746 they assumed control of the trading enterprise Jacob Adami, which became the Gebrüder Bethmann bank in 1748. In 1762 they purchased the Basler Hof mansion and premises from the Patrizier Johann Friedrich Maximilian von Stalburg, which Johann Philipp expanded with further acquisitions in 1787/88.

In 1762 Johann Philipp married Katharina Margarethe Schaaf (1741–1822). He was elected a member and in 1785 director of the "College of the 51", i.e., the body of delegates to the Frankfurt city council. In 1786 he was appointed by Joseph II, who had the House of Bethmann underwrite most of his bond issues, to the office of "imperial counselor" (Wirklicher Kaiserlicher Rat).

After his death in 1793 his only son Simon Moritz continued as head of the bank. Simon Moritz is not to be confused with Simon Moritz Bethmann, 1721-1782, who was Johann Philipp's younger brother.

== Bibliography ==
- Claus Helbing: Die Bethmanns. Aus der Geschichte eines alten Handelshauses zu Frankfurt am Main, Gericke (publishers), Wiesbaden 1948.
- Wolfgang Klötzer (ed.): Frankfurter Biographie. Erster Band A-L, Frankfurt am Main, Waldemar Kramer (publishers), 1994, ISBN 3-7829-0444-3

== See also ==
- Bethmann family
