= Simon Moritz Bethmann =

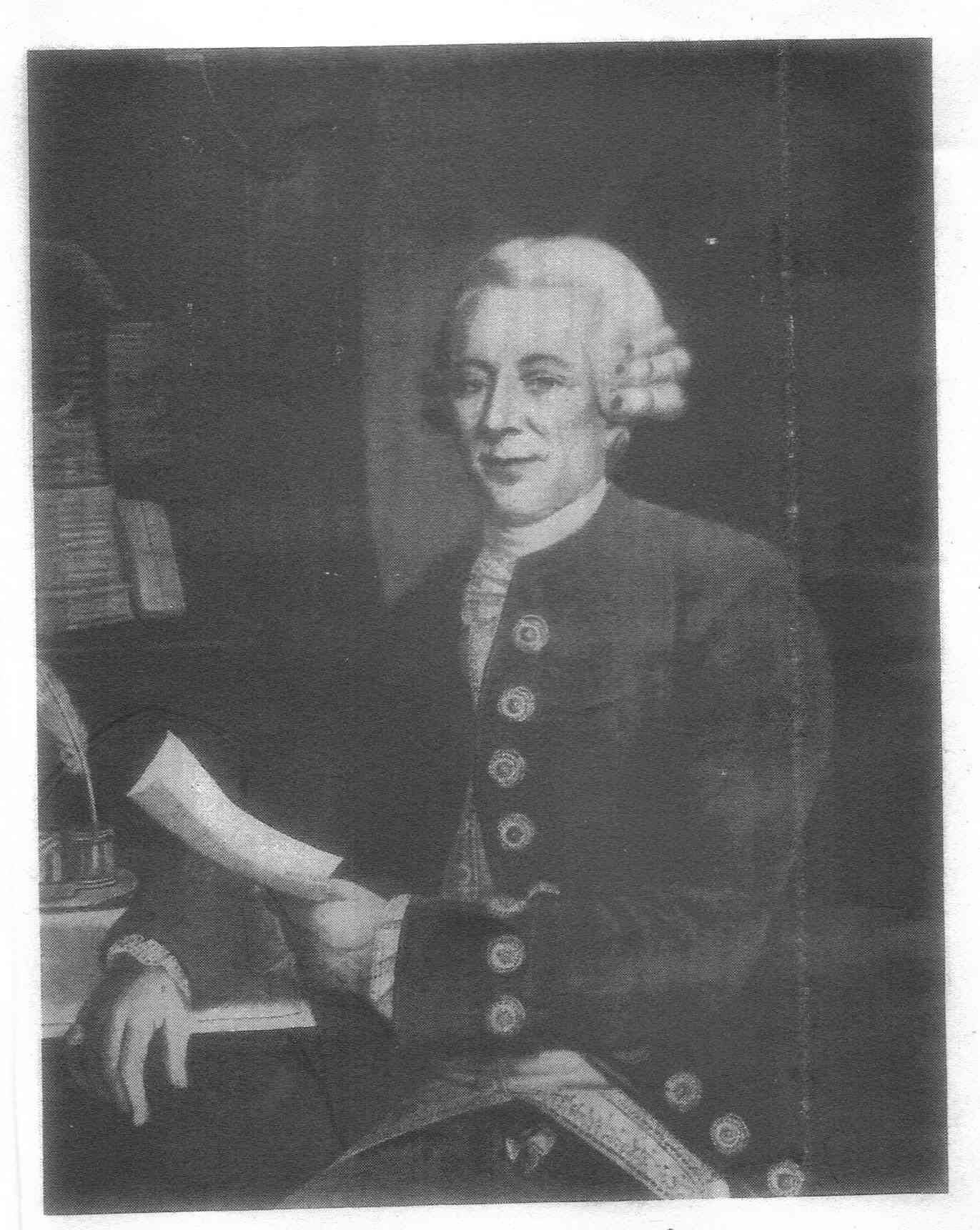
Simon Moritz Bethmann (1721–1782)

Simon Moritz Bethmann (1721–1782) was a German merchant and banker.

== Life ==
Simon Moritz was born in Nassau, northwest of Frankfurt am Main, the youngest son of the identically named Nassovian administrator Simon Moritz Bethmann (1687–1725). Together he and his older brother Johann Philipp founded in 1748 what would become the Bethmann bank, based on the 1746 inheritance from their maternal uncle Jakob Adami in Frankfurt. In 1746, he and Johann Philipp purchased citizenship in Frankfurt for 800 guldens each. Their brother Johann Jakob carried on the family name in Bordeaux, where he became a merchant and shipowner.

In 1755 Simon Moritz became deacon of the Niederländische Gemeinde Augsburgischer Confession (= Dutch Congregation of the Augsburg Confession), a charitable institution transferred to Frankfurt in 1585 by Martinist Lutherans who had fled Antwerp's religious persecution. Together with Johann Philipp he purchased the Basler Hof property from the Patrizier Johann Friedrich Maximilian von Stalburg, where the Bethmann bank maintains offices to this day.

He was married to Elisabeth Rummel, daughter of the Leipzig notable Balthasar Rummel. Noted for his good works—including a bequest of 50,000 guldens to the Frankfurt Citizens' Hospital. He died without issue at Frankfurt am Main in 1782.

== See also ==
- Bethmann family
