= Bethmann Bank =

German private bank

Bethmann Bank AG
- Industry: Private banking
- Founded: 1748
- Founders: Johann Bethmann, Simon Moritz
- Headquarters: Frankfurt am Main, Germany

Bethmann Bank AG is a German private bank headquartered in Frankfurt am Main. It is a subsidiary of the Dutch ABN AMRO Bank N.V. and was the product of a merger between the historical German banks Delbrück, Bethmann and Maffei under the umbrella of the Dutch ABN AMRO Bank. LGT Bank Deutschland joined this group in 2011. Bethmann Bank acquired the German private banking activities of Credit Suisse in December 2013. The acquisition positions Bethmann Bank, ABN AMRO's private bank in Germany, as the third largest private bank in Germany.

Bethmann Bank focuses on management, advisory services and planning for major private assets. It also supports clients in succession planning for family-owned companies and in establishing charitable foundations. The bank's archive is today located in the Frankfurt City archive. Together with the Goethe University Frankfurt am Main and F.A.Z. Media Solutions, Bethmann Bank organised a discussion series called Weltenwandler.tv, which addressed broad social issues.

== History ==
Delbrück & Co. Delbrück & Co. is described as the "financier to the Prussian state". The institution supported young entrepreneurs in the late 19th century, such as Siemens and Krupp. Adelbert Delbrück was one of the founders of Deutsche Bank. Clients at Delbrück & Co and Bethmann were able to use corporate finance and asset management services long before these Anglicisms entered the German language.

Bethmann Bank As a bank for "important projects and clients", Bethmann served Maria Theresa of Austria, Pope Pius VI, Tsar Alexander I and the Goethe family. The private bank helped to finance the construction of the Eiffel Tower and today remains one of the largest promoters of art in Frankfurt am Main.

Maffei Bank The Maffei family, who hailed from Verona, established their own bank in Munich in 1802 and ran it for over 100 years. The family was also a co-founder of the Bayerische Hypotheken- und Wechselbank (later HypoVereinsbank) and the insurance company Münchener Rückversicherung (later Allianz). A member of the family reopened the Maffei Bank after the Second World War. In the years that followed, it continued to move from being a specialist in securities and energy-sector lending to a pure private bank.

ABN AMRO The forerunner of ABN AMRO was founded in the Netherlands by King William I in 1824 and began at an early stage to concentrate on world trade. The financing business led the bank to open branches on all continents, laying the foundation for today's international network.

In 2004, the three banks merged to form Delbrück Bethmann Maffei as a subsidiary of ABN AMRO. In 2011, it was renamed as Bethmann Bank.

== Founding ==
The establishment of the Bethmann bank in Frankfurt am Main is dated to 1748, the year when Johann Philipp Bethmann (1715–1793), who had inherited the trading enterprise of his uncle Jakob Adami in 1746, officially took his brother Simon Moritz as a partner. From that point the enterprise was called Gebrüder Bethmann.

Within a short span of time, the Bethmann bank developed into one of Frankfurt's leading (Christian-owned) banks, on a scale comparable only to its younger rival, the House of Rothschild. The bank's fortunes began to rise in 1754 based on its business in imperial, princely and municipal bonds and skyrocketed from 1778, thanks to the bank's innovation of breaking the Austrian emperor's borrowing down into "sub-bonds" (Partialobligationen) at 1000 gulden each offered to the public, which made them tradeable in secondary markets. This transformed the bank from a lender to an underwriter of bond issues. At one point, the profits of Gebrüder Bethmann exceeded those of all its Frankfurt competitors together, and it ranked first among all German banks.

== Historians on the halcyon years ==
Egon Caesar Conte Corti (1927)

In spite of this new offensive in favor of the House of Rothschild, the business was entrusted to Bethmann, on the ground that the property of that house was 'well known to be so great as to require no other security than a duly binding contract or debenture.' This was a triumph of Bethmann over Rothschild, and it was because the importance and financial greatness of the firm of Rothschild, which at that time [1814] was still of very recent date, was not appreciated at Vienna, and even Barbier had more faith in the old Christian firm of Bethmann than in the upstart Jewish firm.

Paul Johnson (1988)

What happened was this. Until the beginning of the revolutionary wars in France, in the mid-1790s, European merchant banking was dominated by non-Jews: the Barings of London, the Hopes of Amsterdam, and the Gebrüder Bethmann of Frankfurt.

== Steamboats and railroads ==
| 1853 | Founding of Frankfurter Bank, together with Joh. Goll & Söhne, Philipp Nikolaus Schmidt, D. & J. de Neufville, Philipp Donner, W. Gansland & Sohn, and B.H. Goldschmidt. |
| 1887-1889 | Eiffel tower is built in Paris with financing provided by Bethmann bank. (In a repeat of sorts, the Singapore Flyer would be built based on S$240 million financing provided by Delbrück Bethmann Maffei and one other German bank, and the bank also co-financed the Great Orlando Wheel project.) |

== Trivia ==
- In 1763, when Wolfgang Amadeus Mozart and his family were visiting Paris, a letter of recommendation penned by a wife of either Johann Philipp or Simon Moritz Bethmann and addressed to Baron de Grimm served as an effective door opener, as Leopold Mozart wrote afterward.
- When Johann Wolfgang Goethe traveled to Italy in 1768, he was using a bill of exchange payable by a Roman banker and drawn on the Bethmann bank, which had issued the letter to his pseudonym of Möller, not knowing the true identity of the payee.

== See also ==
- Bethmann family

== Bibliography ==
- Claus Helbing: Die Bethmanns. Aus der Geschichte eines alten Handelshauses zu Frankfurt am Main. Gericke (publishers), Wiesbaden 1948.
- Alexander Dietz: Frankfurter Handelsgeschichte, Glashütten 1971, reprint of 1925 edition
- Egon Caesar Conte Corti: Rise of the House of Rothschild, B. Lunn (translator), Books for Business 2001 (reprint of 1928 translation published by Gollancz), ISBN 978-0-89499-058-8, Amazon.co.uk searchable online view
- Erich Achterberg: Frankfurter Bankherren, 2nd revised edition. Fritz Knapp Verlag, Frankfurt am Main 1971. This book was published without an ISBN
- Wolfgang Klötzer (ed.): Frankfurter Biographie. Erster Band A-L. Verlag Waldemar Kramer (publishers), Frankfurt am Main 1994, ISBN 3-7829-0444-3
- Hans Sarkowicz (ed.): Die großen Frankfurter, Frankfurt am Main and Leipzig, 1994, ISBN 3-458-16561-4
- Ralf Roth: Stadt und Bürgertum in Frankfurt am Main, doctoral thesis, University of Frankfurt am Main, 1996
- Paul Johnson: A History of the Jews. Harper Perennial, 1988, ISBN 978-0-06-091533-9
- Carl-Ludwig Holtfrerich: Finanzplatz Frankfurt, Munich, 1999, ISBN 3-406-45184-5
  - Carl-Ludwig Holtfrerich: Frankfurt as a Financial Center: From Medieval Trade Fair to European Banking Centre, Munich, 1999, ISBN 3-406-45671-5, Google Books Preview
- Niall Ferguson: The House of Rothschild. Volume 1, Money's Prophets: 1798-1848. Penguin, 1999, ISBN 978-0-14-024084-9
