= Sachsenpfennig =

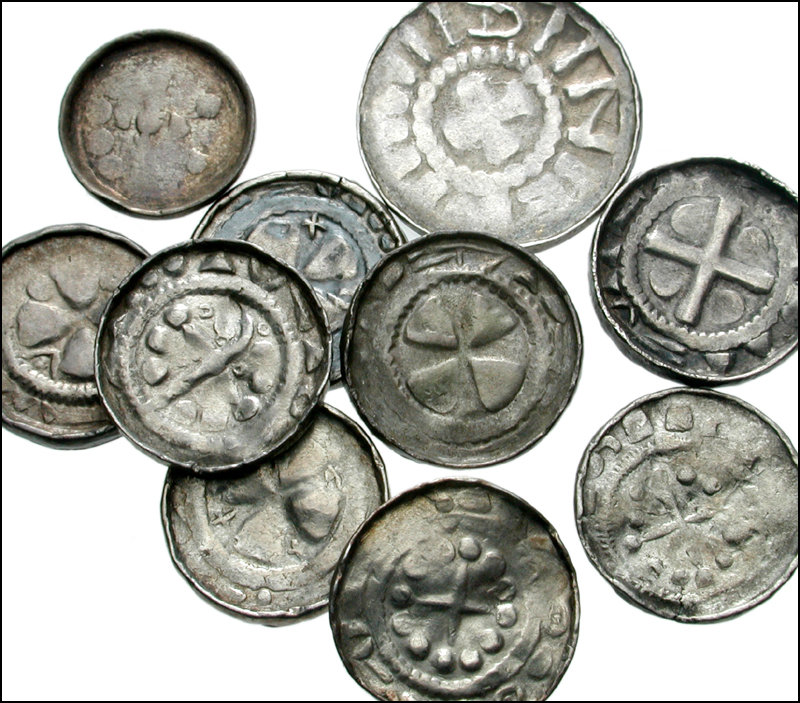
Sachsenpfennigs of different types named after their designs which include the Holzkirchenpfennig ("wooden church"), Balkenkreuzpfennig ("bar cross"), Kleeblattkreuzpfennig ("clover cross") and Krummstabpfennig ("crooked staff")

The Sachsenpfennig ("Saxon pfennig"), sometimes called the Wendenpfennig or the Hochrandpfennig ("high rim pfennig"), was a well-known coin of the pfennig type minted in the eastern part of the Stem Duchy of Saxony during the 10th and 11th centuries. It had an upturned perimeter and, next to the Otto Adelheid Pfennig was the most common pfennig type of its time. Sachsenpfennigs are the oldest coins minted in Saxony. Its different names represent a lack of clarity within mediaeval numismatics about the coin.

== Names ==
Julius Menadier called the pfennig type of the 10th and 11th centuries with an upturned rim the Sachsenpfennig because it was minted in eastern Saxony.

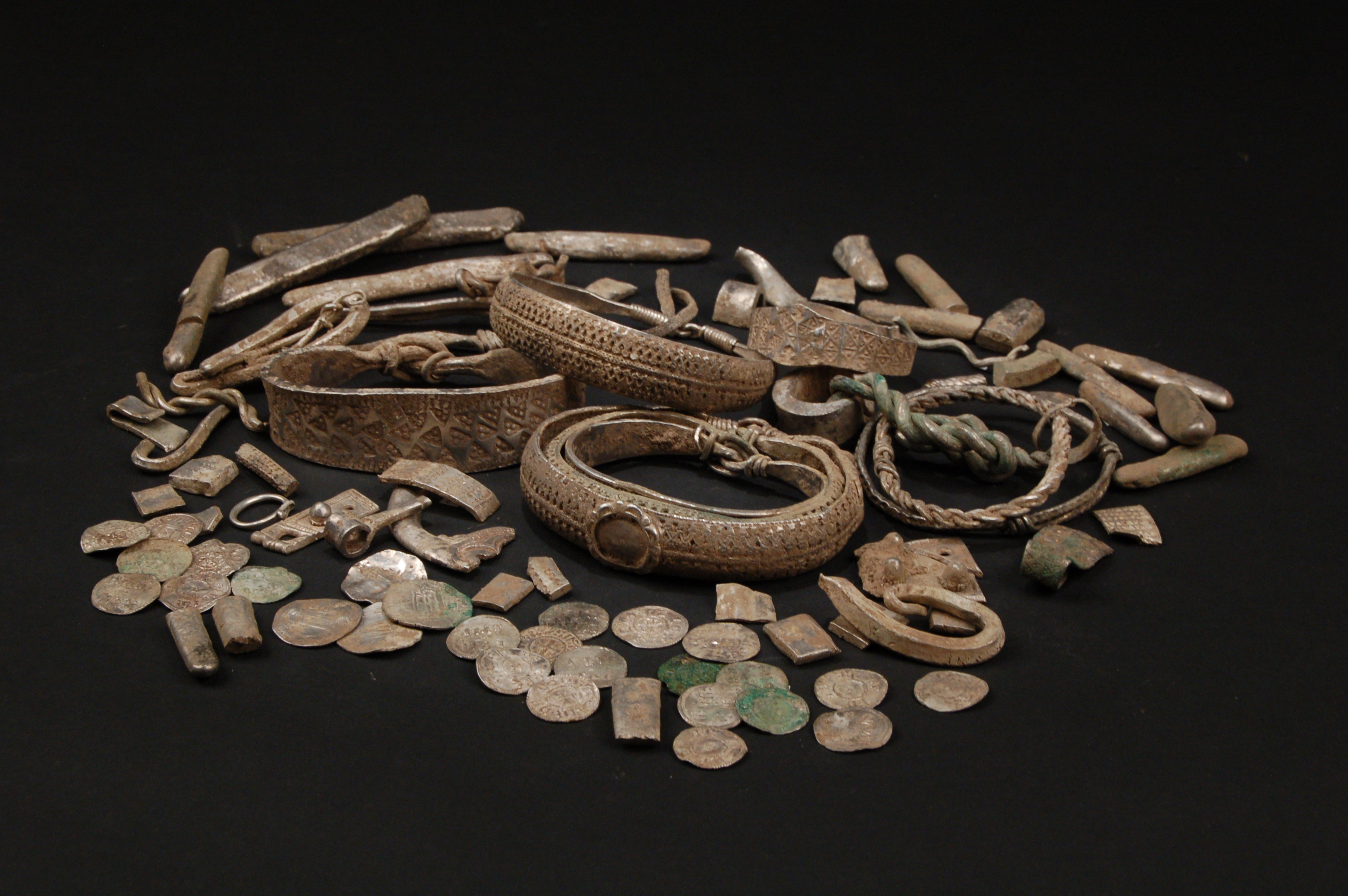
Typical composition of a Viking Age hoard

The older name Wendenpfennig ("Wend pfennig") is inappropriate as a pfennig that the Wends minted, since they still regarded the coins as ingots or so-called hacksilver and did not mint any coins themselves. According to Menadier, the use of hacksilver and coins are mutually exclusive. East of the Elbe among the Slavs (Wends) and Scandinavians (Vikings), the merchants had developed a so-called bullion economy. When paying, silver was cut into the form of ingots, jewellery and coins and weighed with scales and weights. Across the whole of the Slavic lands, hoards of silver weighing several kilogrammes have occasionally survived; they comprise German and West European denarii, Oriental dirhems and Scandinavian jewellery. The pieces were mostly chopped up, broken or cut up.

In Polish and English texts, the term cross denier (Polish: denary krzyzowe, German: Kreuzdenare) appears. An indisputable modern name for these coins is Hochrandpfennig ("high rim pfennig") or Randpfennig ("rim pfennig").

The different names indicate an unclear position in medieval numismatics. Their anonymity and their seemingly primitive coinage led to them being regarded as a separate coin group outside of the normal imperial coinage.

== Coin standard ==
The oldest Sachsenpfennigs were based on the minting standard of the Carolingian monetary reform under which 240 pfennigs were minted from the Carolingian pound of silver weighing 367 g. Twelve pfennigs made one schilling. At that time, the schilling was not an actual coin, but the name of a dozen pfennigs, so it was just a unit of account. In theory, the pfennig weighed 1.5g, however, of the coins that have been found, the lightest were 0.95 g, the heaviest 1.90 g. From Roman antiquity, the talentum was adopted for the pound, solidus for the schilling and denarius for the pfennig. The mintmasters used mine-pure silver as the minting metal. In addition, circulating Roman denarii were melted down. Only pfennigs and 1/2 pfennigs were minted. The 1/2 pfennigs were called obole (Hälblinge = "halflings"). 1/4 pfennigs (fertones) are mentioned, but they were only coins of account or were made by division, not by stamping.

People were clearly happy to check the authenticity of a coin by biting it, as numerous deformed coins from this period show: if the metal gave way, the coin was genuine, if the tooth gave way, iron had been bitten.

== See also ==
- Saxon coin history

== Literature ==
- Walther Haupt: Sächsische Münzkunde, Berlin 1974.
- Arthur Suhle: Die Münze. Von den Anfängen bis zur europäischen Neuzeit, Leipzig 1969.
- Hermann Dannenberg: Die deutschen Münzen der sächsischen und fränkischen Kaiserzeit, Band I–IV. Berlin 1876–1905.
- Heinz Fengler, Gerd Gierow, Willy Unger: transpress Lexikon Numismatik, Berlin 1976.
- Friedrich von Schrötter, N. Bauer, K. Regling, A. Suhle, R. Vasmer, J. Wilcke: Wörterbuch der Münzkunde, Berlin 1970 (Nachdruck der Originalausgabe von 1930), S. 580.
- Heinrich Beck, Bonn, Dieter Geuenich, Duisburg, Heiko Steuer, Freiburg (Hrsg.); begründet von Johannes Hoops: Reallexikon der germanischen Altertumskunde, Band 26, Berlin 2004, S. 61–63. (, p. 61, at Google Books)
- Bernd Schneidmüller, Stefan Weinfurter (Hrsg.): Ottonische Neuanfänge / Symposion zur Ausstellung „Otto der Große, Magdeburg und Europa“, Mainz am Rhein, 2001. Darin: Bernd Kluge: OTTO REX / OTTO IMP. Zur Bestandsaufnahme der ottonischen Münzprägung.
- Julius Menadier: Gesammelte Aufsätze zur Geschichte des deutschen Münzwesens, Dritter Band, Berlin 1895. Darin: XVII. Die Otto-Adelheidpfennige S.170.
- Mittelalter-Forschungen, herausgegeben von Bernd Schneidmüller und Stefan Weinfurter, Band 16. Aufbruch ins zweite Jahrtausend, Innovation und Kontinuität in der Mitte des Mittelalters, Herausgegeben von Achim Hubel und Bernd Schneidmüller. Darin: Heiko Steuer: Münzprägung, Silberströme und Bergbau um das Jahr 1000 in Europa – wirtschaftlicher Aufbruch und technische Innovation, S. 122.
- Kaiserin Adelheid und ihre Klostergründung in Selz. Referate der wissenschaftlichen Tagung in Landau und Selz vom 15. bis 17. Oktober 1999. Herausgegeben von Franz Staab und Thorsten Unger 2005. Darin: Bernd Kluge: ATHALHET, ATEAHLHT und ADELDEIDA. Das Rätsel der Otto-Adelheid-Pfennige.
- Numismatischer Verlag Künker: 1.000 Jahre Europäische Münzgeschichte – Glanz und Faszination des Mittelalters, Osnabrück 2012. Darin: Sachsenpfennige S. 137 (Magdeburg) und Otto-Adelheid-Pfennige, S. 107/108 (hier aus dem Raum Goslar). (, p. 140, at Google Books).
- Walter Hävernick (Hrsg.): Numismatische Studien, Heft 3/4. Vera Jammer: Die Anfänge der Münzprägung im Herzogtum Sachsen (10. und 11. Jahrhundert), Hamburg 1952.
- Christoph Kilger: Pfennigmärkte und Währungslandschaften, Monetarisierungen im sächsisch-slawischen Grenzland ca. 965 – 1120, Stockholm 2000.
