= Albus (coin) =

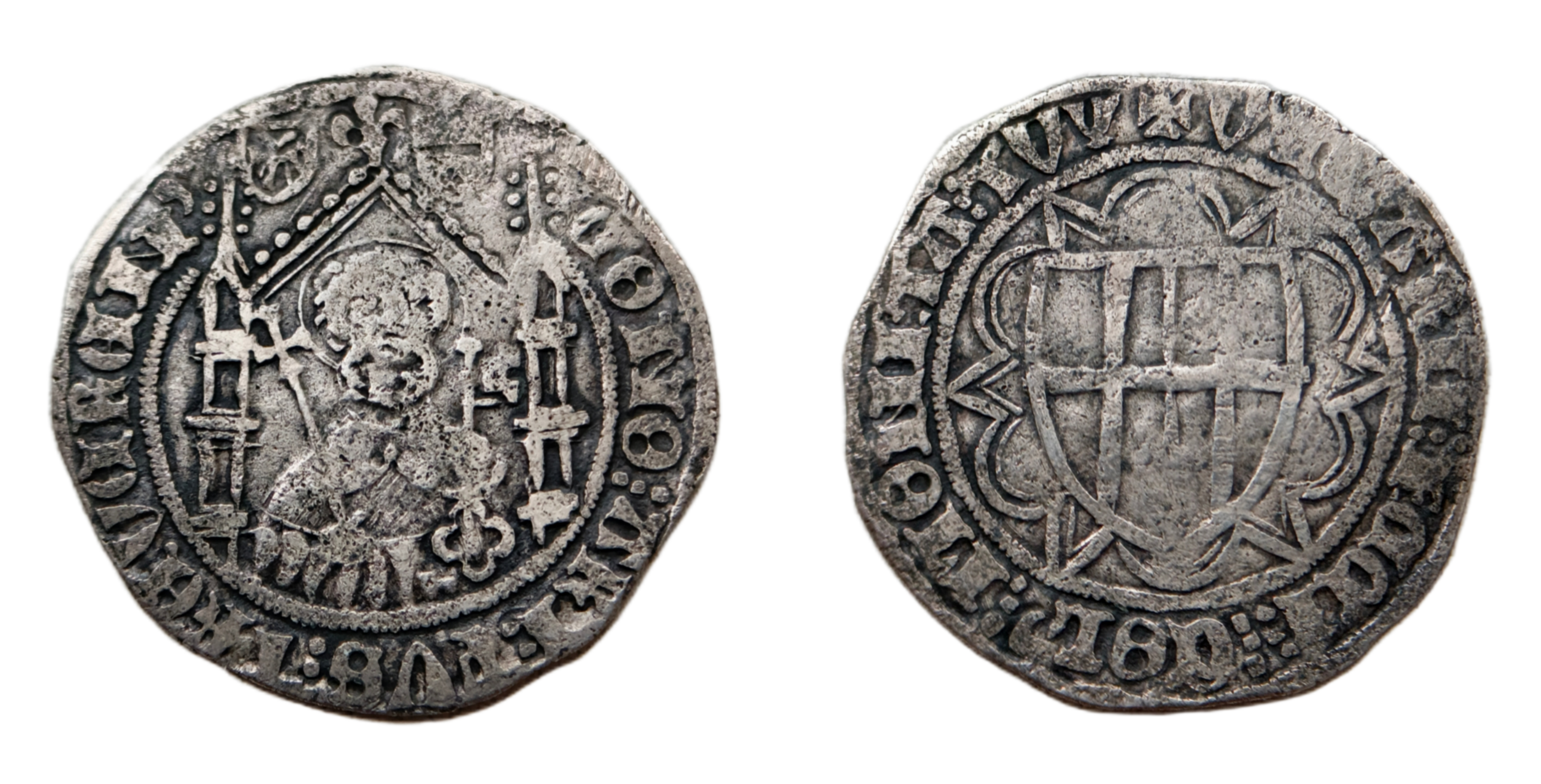
Weisspfennig (Albus) - Cuno II of Falkenstein.

From the Late Middle Ages the albus was a common currency in parts of the Holy Roman Empire, especially in the Rhineland. The name albus is Latin and means "white". Because of its higher silver content, this lighter coin differed in colour from the other inferior coins. This resulted in the names denarius albus (white pfennig), Weißpfennig or Rhenish groschen.

== History ==
The albus was a silver groschen coin of the Late Middle Ages that was distributed in the Lower Rhine region from the second half of the 14th century. The four Rhenish electors, who united in 1385/86 to form the Rhenish Minting Union (Rheinischer Münzverein), together had the Weißpfennig minted as a silver coin alongside the Rhenish gold gulden. While the gold gulden was used as a trade coin, the Weißpfennig was an "everyday coin". On one side the Mainz Weißpfennig displayed the "Wheel of Mainz" and was therefore also called the Raderalbus ("wheel albus").

The albus was introduced around the middle of the 14th century by the Archbishop of Trier, Kuno II of Falkenstein and is first documented in the coinage treaty between Cologne and Trier in 1372. Over time, the albus became the currency of the coin union of the Electors of Trier, Mainz and Cologne, and was adopted by numerous adjacent territories.

On the obverse there were initially Christian motifs, depictions of Christ and the saints. In Trier, from 1625, the albus was also known as the Petermenger (Petermännchen or "Little Peter") because it portrayed Saint Peter on the obverse. This version was distributed in huge quantities until 1689 and spread across the whole of western Germany to Westphalia, Thuringia and Brandenburg. On the reverse, the coins usually depicted the coat of arms of the originating city; in Mainz, for example, the Wheel of Mainz, the so-called Raderalbus, which was worth 24 pfennigs i.e. a double schilling. The design also changed over time. From 1689 the image of St. Peter was replaced by the "three-peter man" (Dreipetermännchen). This coin was very successful and soon became a coveted means of payment as far as the River Elbe in the east. The Dreipetermännchenremained in circulation in many variants until 1715. In 1760, minting was resumed by the Koblenz Mint. The inscription III PETERMENGER was replaced by 24 ONE MARCK FEIN SILBER, since it was supposed to be worth 6 kreuzers.

After the coinage edict for the conversion of foreign currencies by Count Palatine Wolfgang William of 1 September 1620, the following values were set for the Duchy of Jülich-Berg: 1 Reichstaler = 78 Albus; 1 Albus = 12 Hellers.

In the Grand Duchy of Hesse the Reichstaler, Batzen and Albus were only coins of account. According to the minting convention of 25 August 1837, the new issue of the Reichsgulden was also an invoice coin.

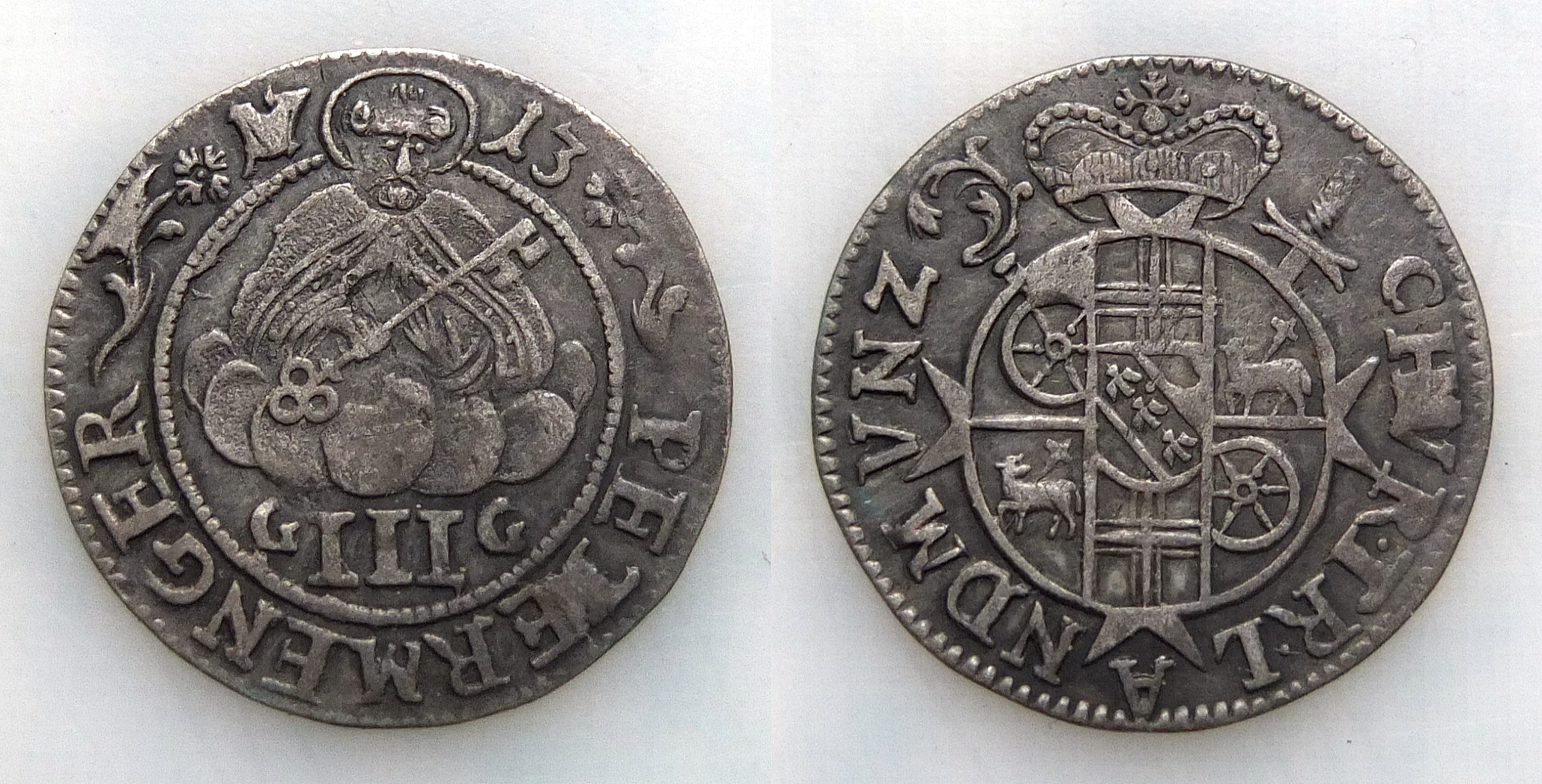
- Triple Albus "3 Petermenger", Trier, 1713, Charles Joseph of Lorraine, Elector of Trier
  1 Reichstaler = 1 ½ Gulden = 22 ½ Batzen = 30 Groschen = 45 Albus = 90 Kreuzers = 360 Pfennigs = 384 Hellers

In the Thirty Years' War (1618-1648), the coin lost its importance, but was still minted regionally as a low denomination coin in the 18th century (e.g. in Hesse). In Jülich-Berg, Stübers became more important during the period.

== Distribution ==
Since the Rhenish Groschen was very popular, it became widespread between Heidelberg on the southern border of the Palatinate lands to Moers on the Lower Rhine border in the north and was coined by numerous Rhenish and Westphalian lords.

== Literature ==
- Heinz Fengler, Gerhard Gierow. Willy Unger: Numismatik. Transpress, Berlin 1988, ISBN 3-344-00220-1.
- Helmut Kahnt: Das große Münzlexikon von A bis Z. Gietl, Regenstauf 2005, ISBN 3-924861-84-6.
- Heribert Engel: Finanzgeschichte des Herzogtums Jülich. Bonn 1958.
- Arthur Suhle: "Die Groschen- und Goldmünzprägung im 14. und 15. Jahrhundert" In: Deutsche Münz- und Geldgeschichte von den Anfängen bis zum 15. Jahrhundert. Berlin 1974.
