= Regional pfennig =

The regional pfennig was a type of pfennig, a low denomination coin used in the Holy Roman Empire that began to appear in the 10th century after the period of the supra-regional pfennigs (mid-8th to mid-10th centuries) following the coin reform of the Emperor Charlemagne of Francia. With the increasing allocation of royal minting rights under the Münzregal to other mints, different types of pfennig emerged. The mints with their own minting rights included those cities that had attained a special degree of independence, in some cases even imperial immediacy. However, a localization of coinage was partly counteracted by a move by cities to form minting associations or Münzvereins, in which minting agreement standards for the weight and, above all, the fineness of coins were set. which must not be undercut in order to ensure unrestricted convertibility of the coins within the contract area. In later centuries, larger denominations of higher value were introduced, such as the groschen (grossus) and, in the Alpine region, the Kreuzer. The pfennig thus fell from being a major coin and currency money to a small Scheidemünze coin. Attempts at standardisation concentrated on the new, larger denominations and no longer on the pfennig, which basically remained a state coin of only regional significance. In Germany, the pfennig was only successfully unified again in the 19th century, initially through the Prussian small coinage reform of 1821 for the various small coins in the Prussian provinces, and then through the second Imperial Coin Act of 1873.

The most important regional pfennigs include the Sachsenpfennig ("Saxon pfennig"), also known as the Wendenpfennig, and the Otto Adelheid Pfennig, the earliest mintings of which still followed the Carolingian standard. In particular, the later Sachsenpfennig and other regional pfennigs, such as the Regensburg Pfennig, the Vienna Pfennig, the Friesach Pfennig or the Krainer Pfennig, moved further and further away from their Carolingian model. There was no longer any uniformity in weights and fineness as there had been in the Carolingian monetary system. A pfennig or denarius from one region was no longer necessarily worth a pfennig in another region.

== Gallery ==
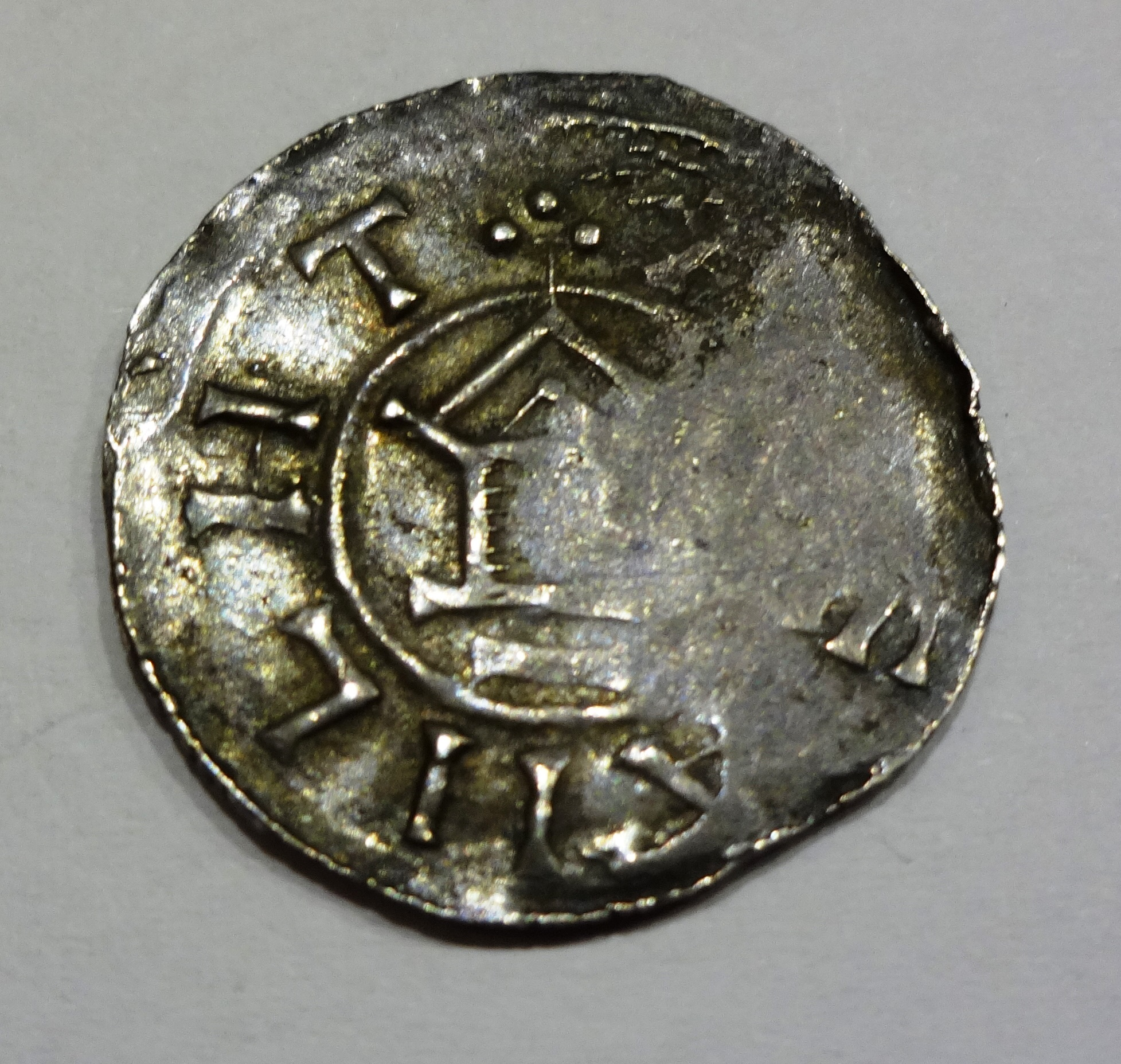
Otto Adelheid Pfennig, reverse, Goslar Mint

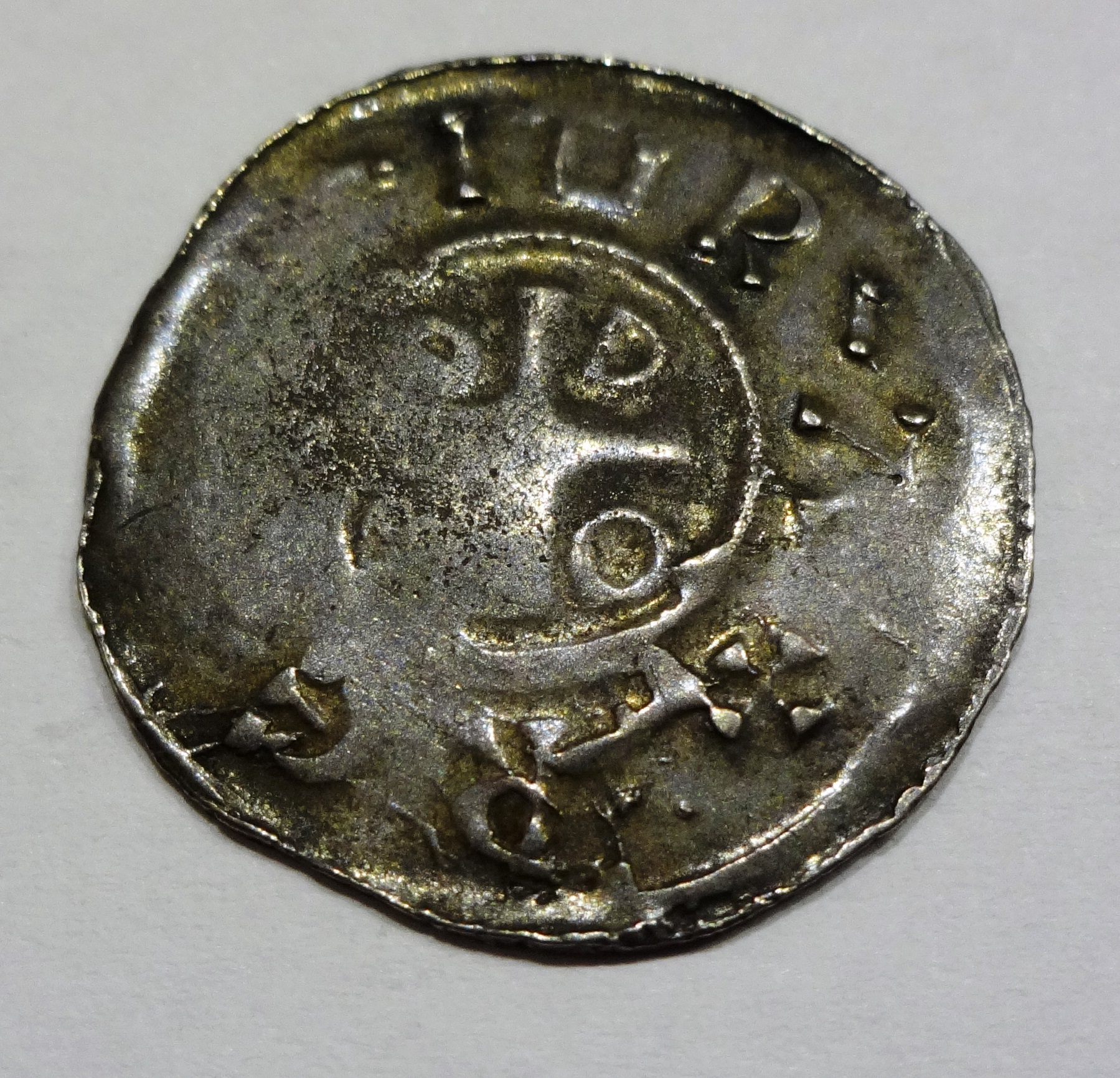
Otto Adelheid Pfennig, obverse, Goslar mint

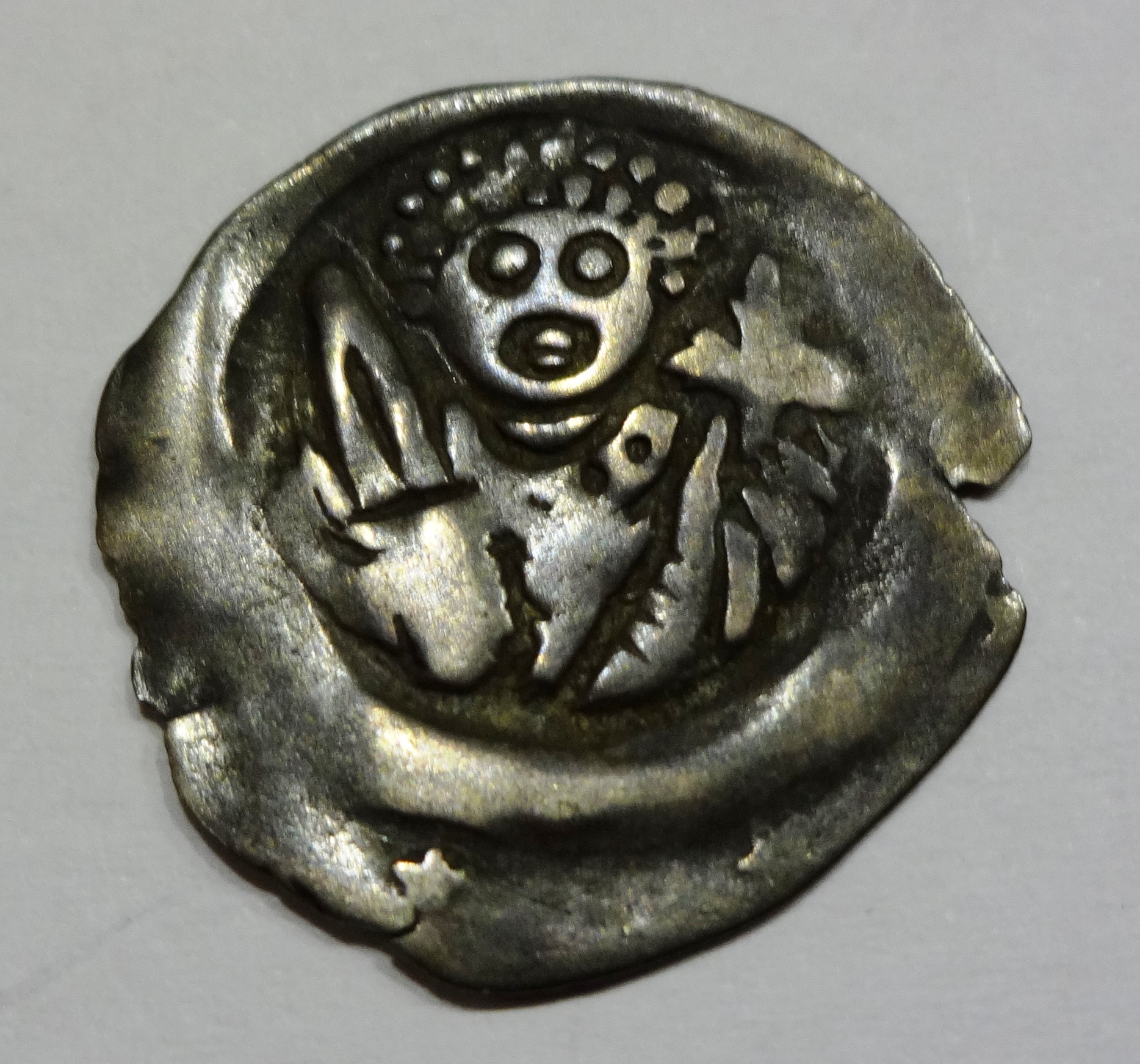
Regensburg Pfennig, 13th century, Ex-Dr. Robert Friedingen-Pranten

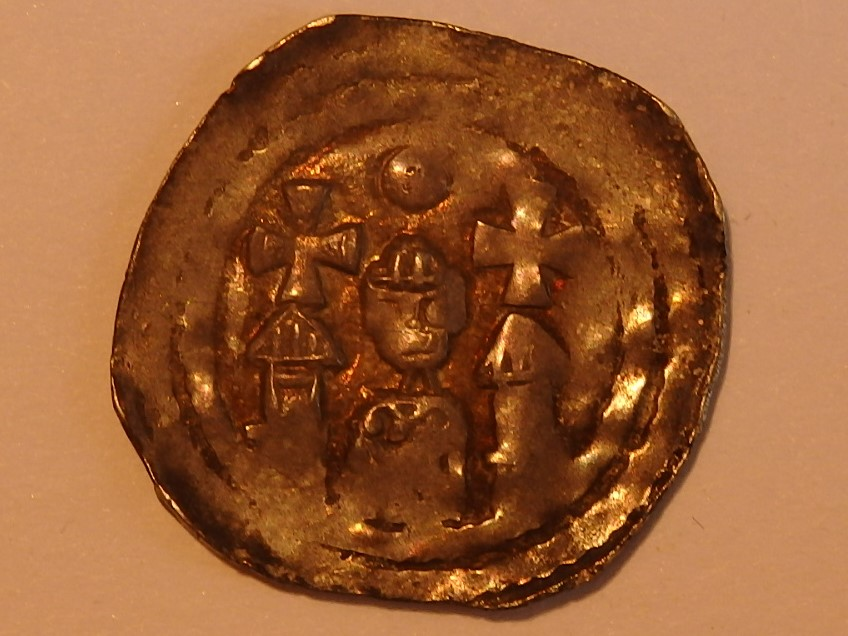
Carniolan Pfennig, 13th century (1218–51)

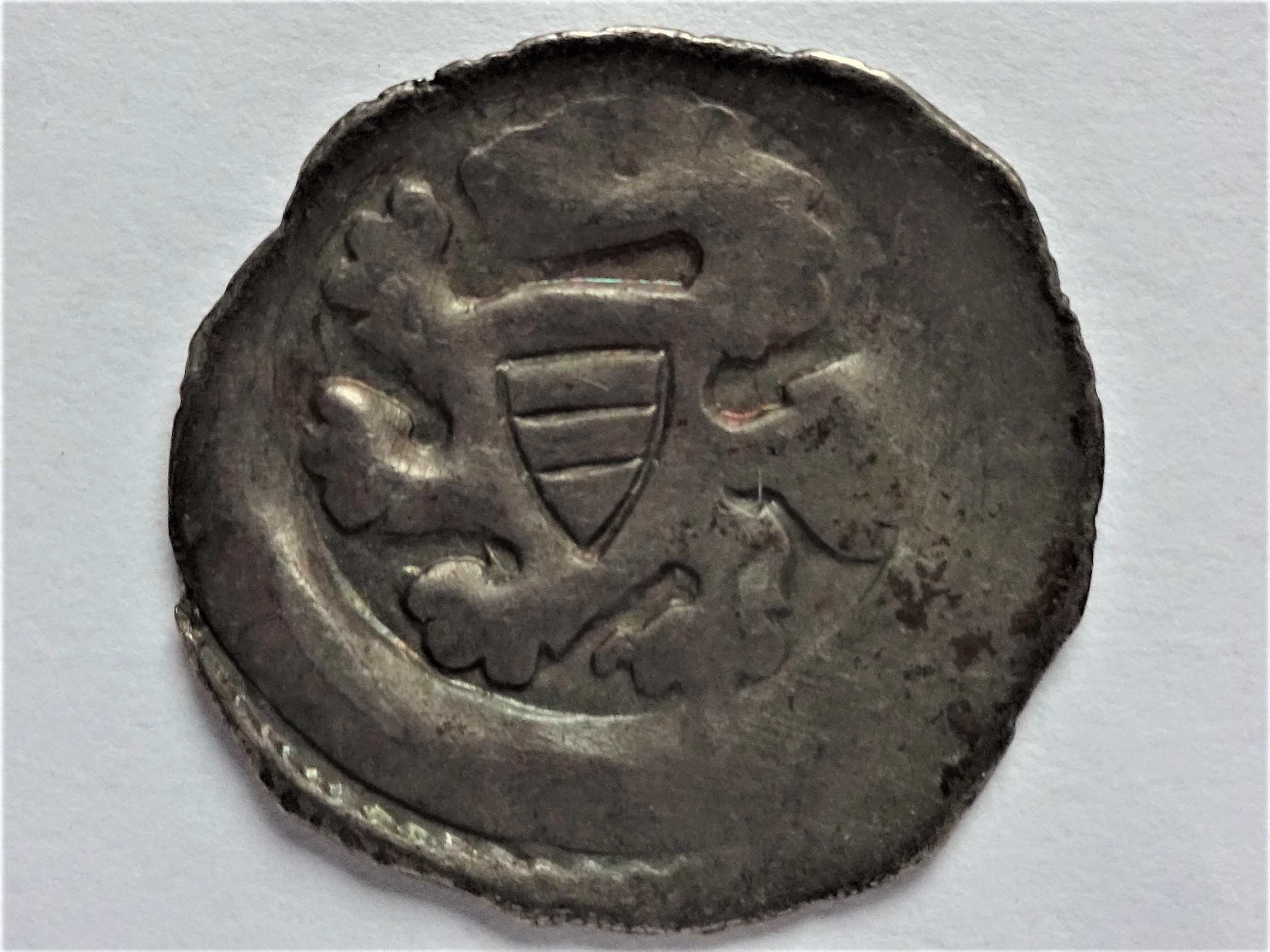
Vienna Pfennig, lion with breastplate, 14th century

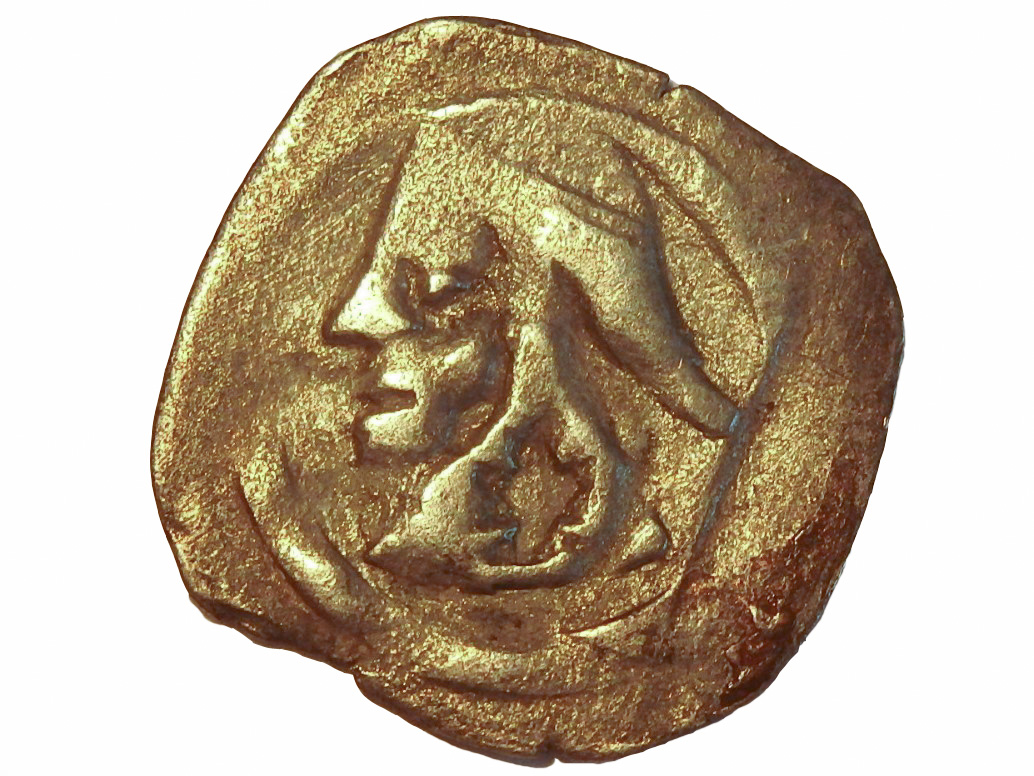
Munich Pfennig, 14th century (1349–75)

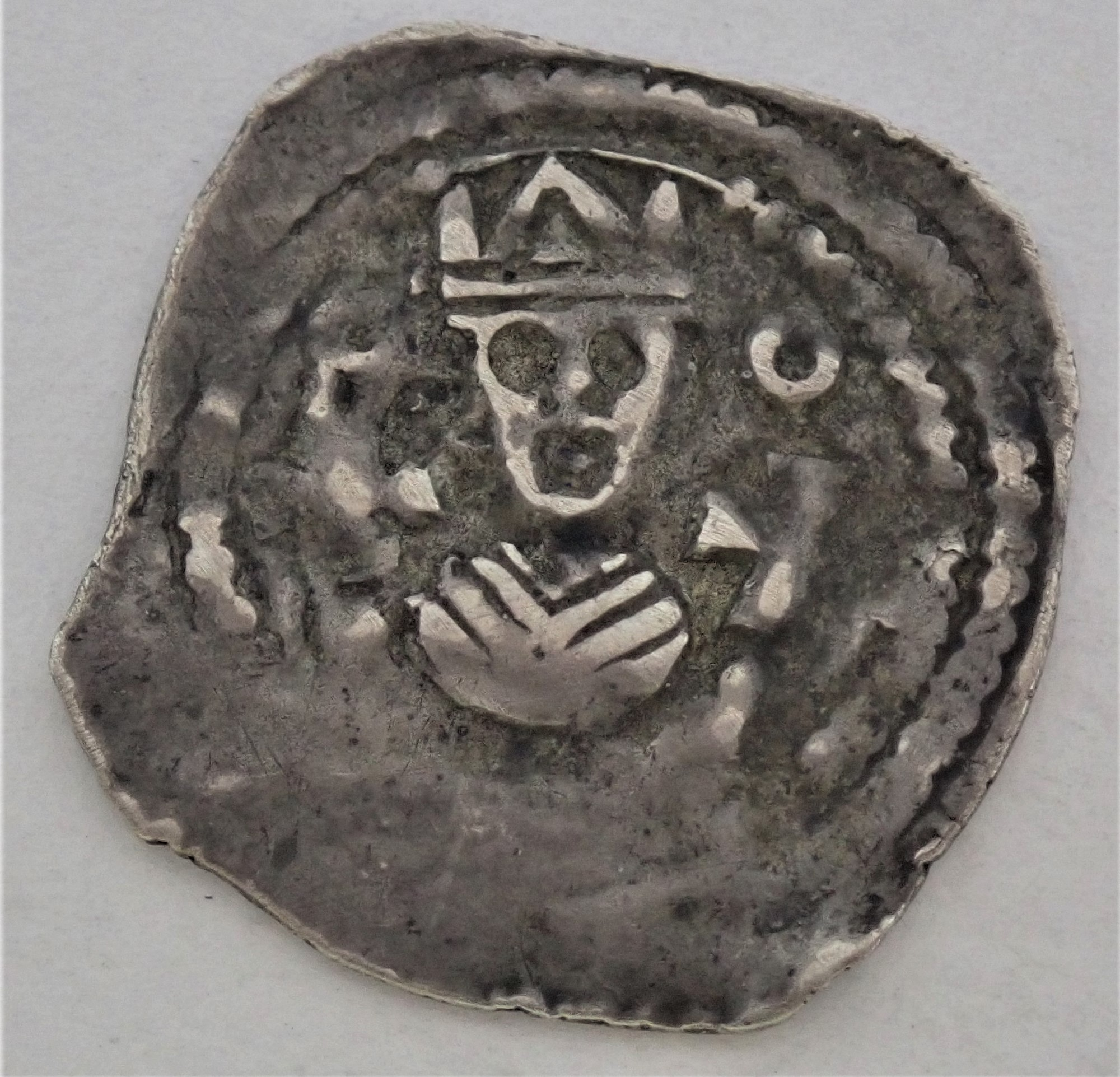
Friesach Pfennig for Salzburg, bishop, obverse

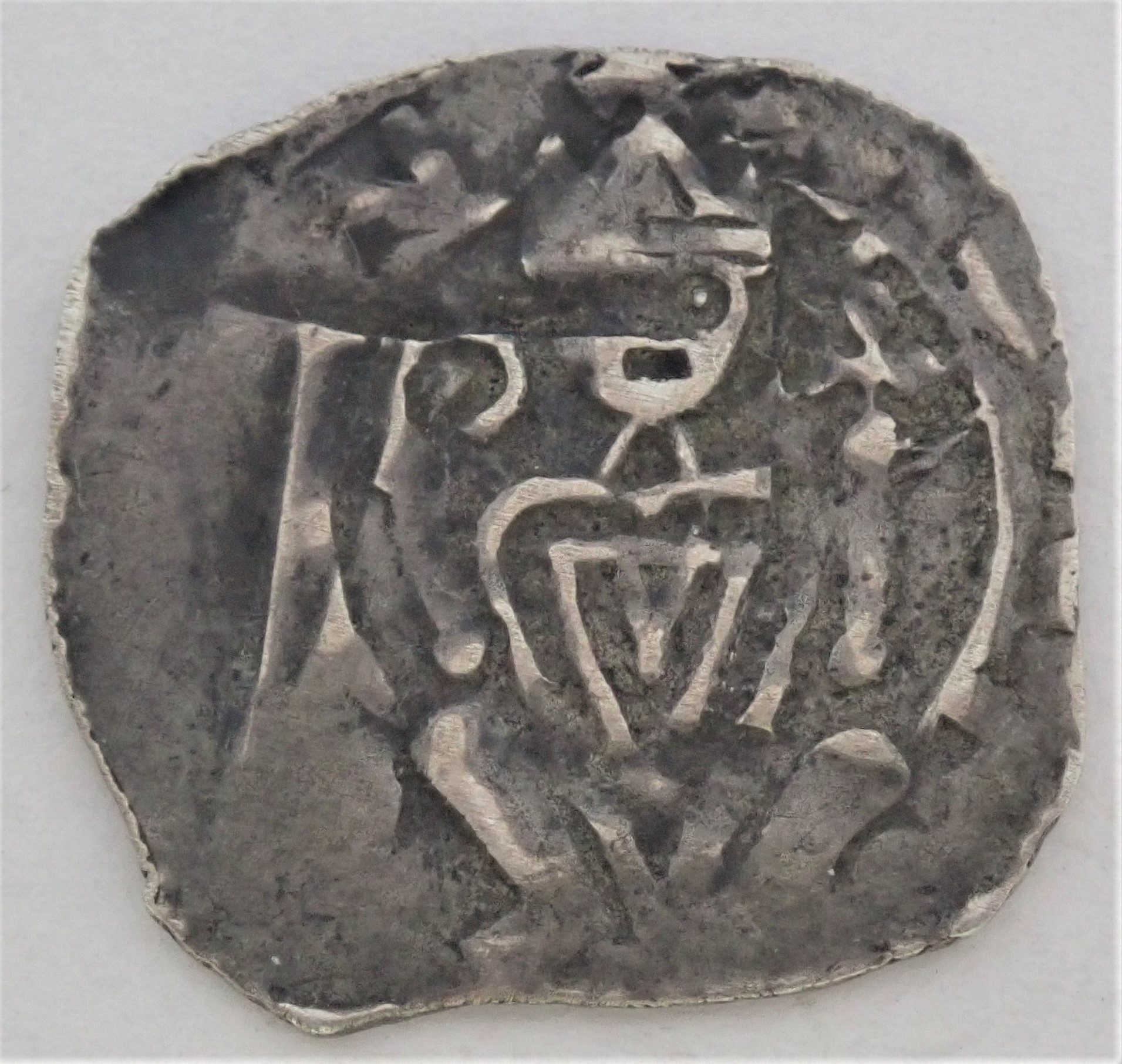
Friesach Pfennig for Salzburg, reverse

== Literature ==
- Bernd Kluge (2016). Münzen – Eine Geschichte von der Antike bis zur Gegenwart. Munich.
- Wolfgang Trapp (1999). Kleines Handbuch der Münzkunde und des Geldwesens in Deutschland. Reclam-Verlag, Stuttgart.
