= Pfennig =

Former German coin or note (9th century-2002)

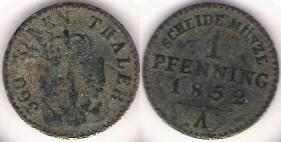
Prussia: 1 pfenning 1852. The obverse reads: 360 [make up] one thaler.

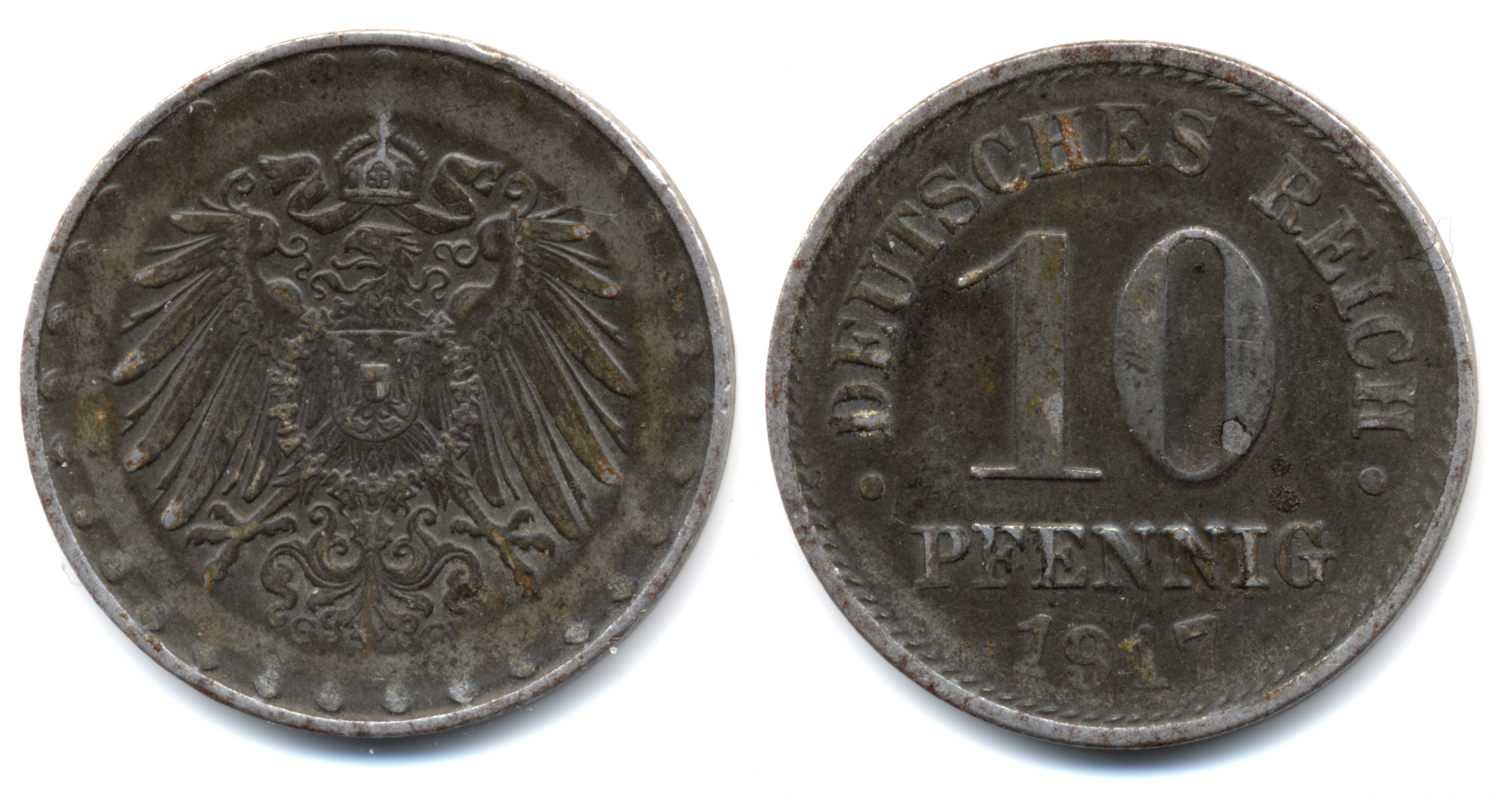
German Empire: 10-pfennig iron coin 1917

The pfennig (German: [ˈpfɛnɪç]; pl. 'pfennigs' or 'pfennige'; symbol pf or ₰) or penny is a former German coin or note, which was an official currency from the 9th century until the introduction of the euro in 2002. While a valuable coin during the Middle Ages, it lost its value through the years and was the minor coin of the Mark currencies in the German Reich, West Germany and East Germany, and the reunified Germany until the introduction of the euro. Pfennig was also the name of the subunit of the Danzig mark (1922–1923) and the Danzig gulden (1923–1939) in the Free City of Danzig (modern Gdańsk, Poland). The Bosnia and Herzegovina convertible mark uses an alternate spelling of pfennig, “fenning", as its subunit, and after Germany adopted the euro, remains the only currency to use pfennigs.

== Overview ==
=== Name ===
The word Pfennig (replacing the denarius or denarius as a low-denomination silver coin) can be traced back to the 8th century and also became known as the Penning, Panni(n)g , Pfenni(n)c, Pfending and by other names, e.g. in Prussia until 1873, Pfenning. (Note: In this case, the term Pfenning served to differentiate it from the pfennig used before 1821, when the thaler was still worth 24 (good) groschen or 288 pfennigs and not 30 silver groschen as it was from 1821 which was worth 360 pfennings.) The -ing- or -inc suffix was used, in addition to -ung, the formation of affiliation substantives and also appears in other coin denominations, for example in the schilling. Beyond that, its origin has not been clarified, but an early borrowing from the Latin pondus ("weight", cf. pound) is possible. According to an 1848 Leipzig trade lexicon the name pfennig was "originally the general name of every coin in Germany, which is supposed to be derived from the hollow coins or bracteates, because these had the shape of a pan" (i.e. they were bent)."

The word Pfennig is etymologically related to the English penny, the Swedish penning, which was also the model for the Finnish penni (1860–2001), the Estonian penn (1918–1927), the Polish fenig (1917–1918), the Lithuanian word for money pinigai and the pfenig (fening) of Bosnia and Herzegovina (1998–today). The /pf/ rather than /p/ in both pronunciation and spelling is a result of the High German consonant shift or second Germanic sound shift which affected the High German dialects of what is now southern Germany, Switzerland and Austria. High German (and to some extent Central German) dialects form the basis for modern Standard German.

=== Related currencies ===
The pfennig was the progenitor of a whole series of later coin denominations, which became parts or multiples of the later pfennig. These include the groschen ("big [pfennig]", from the Latin grossus "big, thick" ), Angster ("narrow [pfennig]", from the Latin angustus "narrow, thin"), Albus ("white [pfennig]", from the Latin albus "white"; initially equivalent to a Groschen), Witte ("white [pfennig]"), Rappen ("pfennig with a raven"), Stäbler ("pfennig with the Basle staff"), Heller ("Haller [pfennig]"), Schwaren ("heavy [pfennig]") etc.

There were also "light pfennigs" (leichte Pfennige), "good pfennigs" (gute Pfennige) or "custom pfennigs" (Zollpfennige), which had this name on the coin. Some types of pfennig were given special names in the vernacular, such as the Erfurt "coffin pfennig" (Sargpfennig). (Note: he Erfurt Sargpfennigs were allegedly minted from the coffins containing silver of Catholic saints around 1525 during the Reformation period and some had corresponding symbolism, depicting a skull and crossbones.)

== Sign ==
Kurrent ⟨d⟩ and ⟨D⟩.

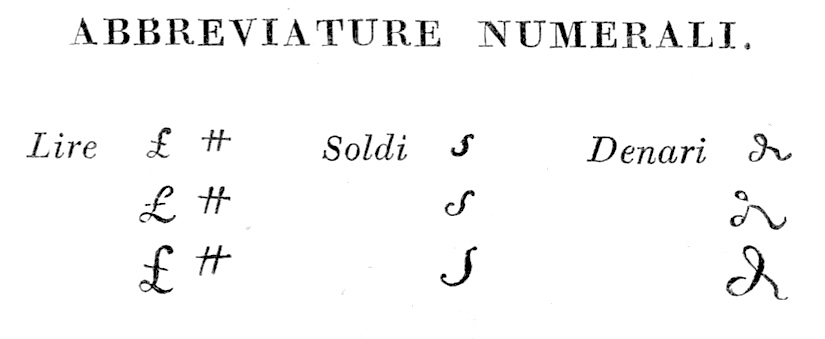
£ and ₶ for lire, 𝒮 for soldi, ₰ for denari in Bodoni (1818), Manuale tipografico.

As a currency sign a variation of the minuscule letter 'd' with a swash for 'denarius' in script (generally German Kurrent script or round hand in the 19th and 20th centuries), with its swash going from ascender to baseline or descender level, thus forming a distinct symbol: ₰. The symbol was also used for the denarius or equivalent units in other languages like denier in French or denario in Italian.

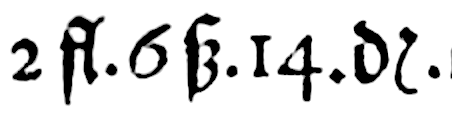
The penny sign ₰ printed as dꝭ in Schreiber (1572) in "2 fl.6 ß.14.dꝭ" (2 florin, 6 schilling, 14 pfennig).

The penny sign ₰ in Rudolff (1553) in "3 gꝭ. 1 ẜ. 3 ₰" (3 groschen, 1 schilling, 3 pfennigs).

The penny sign ₰ in Hemeling (1753) in "2636 thl. 25 gꝭ. 7 ₰" (2636 thaler, 25 groschen, 7 pfennig).

The pfennig symbol has nearly fallen out of use since the 1950s, with the demise and eventual abolition of the Reichsmark with its Reichspfennig, as well as the abolition of Kurrent by the Nazis on 3 January 1941, thus making it increasingly cryptic as familiarity with Kurrent script has decreased since that time. The symbol is encoded in Unicode at U+20B0 ₰ GERMAN PENNY SIGN. In some system fonts, the glyph of the symbol is mistakenly drawn as a Pf letters sequence or ligature ( in Aptos 2.01, in Lucida Grande 15.0), as Pf was used as an abbreviation for Pfennig.

Unicode has U+3338 ㌸ SQUARE PENIHI, a square combination of ペニヒ (penihi), Japanese for "pfennig", for compatibility with earlier Japanese character sets.

== History ==
=== Middle Ages ===
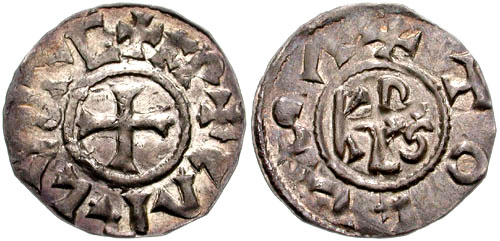
Carolingian denarius (French: denier)

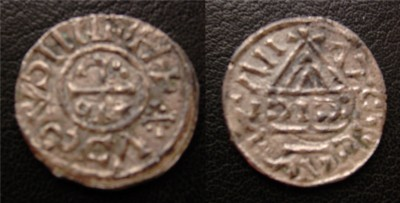
Regensburg pfennig, 10th century

Charlemagne established, in the so-called Carolingian coin standard, that from a Carolingian Pfund ("pound") of silver, 240 coins were to be minted (corresponding to about 1.7 g of silver per coin). The coin was called in the Latin language of the time, a denarius after the old Roman coin (see Sachsenpfennig § Coin standard). From this coin evolved later the French denier and the Italian denaro. The Arabic word dinar (دينار) can also be traced back to the Latin word denarius. In the Old High German language, the denarius was already called the pfennig ("phenninc") at the time of Charlemagne. In North German and Dutch-speaking countries it was later called a Penning and in England the penny. The term paenig for the Roman denarius first appeared in England around 765, when King Offa had denarii struck out of silver based on the Carolingian model. This explains the abbreviation "d" as in denarius, which was used for the "old" penny in the United Kingdom until 1971. The early pfennig weighed around 1.3g to 2g, its weight tending to steadily decrease over the centuries. The widespread fluctuations in the weight of the same pfennigs were partly due to the manufacturing process, with the heavier pfennig specimens being sought out by private individuals in accordance with Gresham's law. At that time and even partly up to modern times, it was the total weight of a certain number of similar pfennigs that had to be right for larger payments, a practice that tended to promote deviating exchange rates between smaller and larger coin denominations and which found its climax in the Kipper and Wipper era; for example, the terms Schockpfennig (= 60 pf), Schockgroschen or "pound sterling" (= 240 d).

From the 8th to the 13th century, the pfennig (or denarius) consisted of high-quality silver and was the only denomination in circulation, other units being used purely as arithmetic units, and it thus had a high purchasing power. As a result, this era is also called the Pfennigzeit ("pfennig era") in numismatics. Only very rarely were half-pfennigs minted, which were also known as obole or scherf.

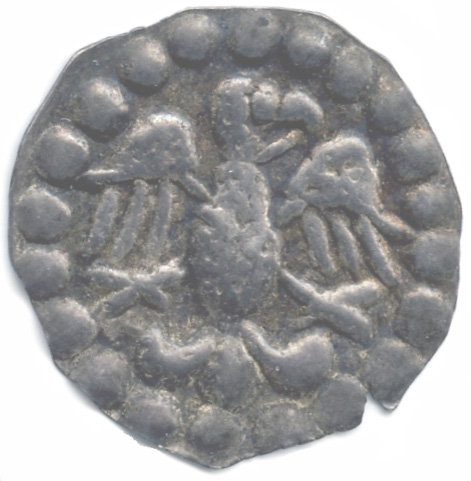
Rottweil pfennig, 1200–1220

Around 1200, the pfennig was the largest and only German silver denomination, apart from imported foreign gold and silver coins. Smaller denominations were created by cutting the coins in half or quarters, producing something called hacksilver, which was very easy to do with the one-sided thin hollow pfennigs or strubben, which were then referred to as bracteates from the 17th century. The "change" that was often still required for price and quantity equalization by buyers and sellers on the city markets were small amounts of natural produce and goods that were included in the overall purchase process.

Around 1200, the different mint lords of the Holy Roman Empire minted their regional pfennigs to very different standards in terms of gross and fine weights, because the German kingdom handed over minting rights or did not enforce them as a uniform imperial standard consistently. As a result, many regional pfennigs with different exchange rates arose over time. Somes coins had a black tint due to the large addition of copper, and so a distinction was made between white pfennigs (Wißpennig, Albus, Silberpfennig) and black pfennigs (Kupferpfennig = "copper pfennig"). A well-known example is the Haller Pfennig, which was later legally defined as a heller or haller in subsequent imperial coinage regulations as a separate denomination valued at two to a pfennig until the 19th century e.g. in Bavaria. Even the early hellers (Händleinheller) had a noticeable addition of copper, so that the heller very quickly became the first German "pure" copper coin.

The pfennigs of the Schinderling period, the black pfennigs, were minted from 1457 mainly in southern Germany, especially in Austria and Bavaria, with almost no silver. The so-called Böse Halser ("Evil Halser") of this time essentially consisted of a copper-tin alloy. The period of the so-called Schinderling ended with the phasing out of the 5-lot pfennigs in 1460. The black pfennigs undermined confidence in Austria's silver currency for a long time.

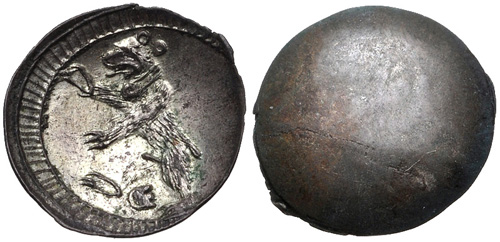
Schüsselpfennig, St. Gallen, clipped

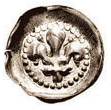
Lilienpfennig, Strasbourg

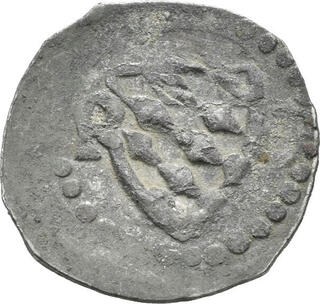
Palatine Weckeler

For the successful introduction of the silver groschen currency, which replaced the regional pfennig, sufficient coins of lower denomination had to be available. The silver-rich Saxon dukes, for example, had hollow pfennigs and hollow hellers minted at Gotha and Langensalza to prescribed coinage ordinances. However, the constant reduction in the silver content of the groschen meant that new ordinances to reduce the silver content of the pfennigs that the cities sometimes minted themselves.

The Schüsselpfennig ("bowl pfennig") minted from 1374 to the 18th century is a concave pfennig, stamped on one side only, that was minted from 1374 onwards, and was so called due to its minting technique. It was created by stamping using one upper die only onto a larger planchet. As a result, the rim of the coin was pressed upwards into the shape of a bowl or plate.

The forerunners of the Schüsselpfennig were the one-sided silver Engelpfennigs (lit. 'angel penny') and Lilienpfennig (lit. 'lily penny') of the Free Imperial City Strasbourg and the Trier pfennigs, which were being minted as early as the beginning of the 14th century. They are so-called ewige Pfennige ("eternal pfennigs"), since unlike most bracteates, they did not have to be exchanged regularly for a fee.

The so-called Palatine Weckeler, named after its depiction of a lozenged shield or heraldic lozenge (German: Wecke), was minted from about 1390. From the 15th century, a characteristic feature of the pfennig was its curved shape and a prominent circle of beads, which surrounded the coin image. The pearl circle does not occur in the later Schüsselpfennig minted from the 16th to the 18th century.

=== Pricing examples from the Saxon-Thuringian region ===
Krug gives the following examples of what could be bought for pfennigs in regions of Saxony and Thuringia:

| 1324 | a chicken: 2 pfennigs |
| | a lamb's belly: 8 pfennigs |
| pre-1382 | a fattened pig: 360 pfennigs |
| | a young pig: 180 pfennigs |
| 1382 | a schock (60) of eggs: 10 pfennigs |
| | 8 ells of linen cloth: 54 pfennigs |
| | a tub (Hafen) of butter: 40 pfennigs |
| | a pat of fresh butter: 3 pfennigs |
| 1395 | six chickens: 48 pfennigs |

The pfennigs concerned were usually the coins from the Freiberg state mint.

=== Modern period ===
==== 17th and 18th centuries ====
By the late 17th century, the pfennigs had lost most of their value. The last pfennig coins containing traces of silver are rarities minted in 1805. Effectively, by the end of the 17th century the pfennig had been reduced to a pure copper coin. In the 18th century, some German mints minted copper and billon pfennigs at around the same time. From the middle of the 18th century, however, the proportion of billon coins compared to pure copper pfennig coins tended to decrease, which was also reflected in the 2 to 4 pfennig coins. The last silver-containing 1 pfennig coins with the designation "Pfenig" were minted in Germany in the Duchy of Saxe-Coburg-Saalfeld from 1808 to 1811 and date stamped 1808 and are rare. Even the copper pfennigs were not all of the same value. Bremen therefore called its pfennigs sware penninge ("heavy pfennigs") for which the common name Schwaren prevailed.

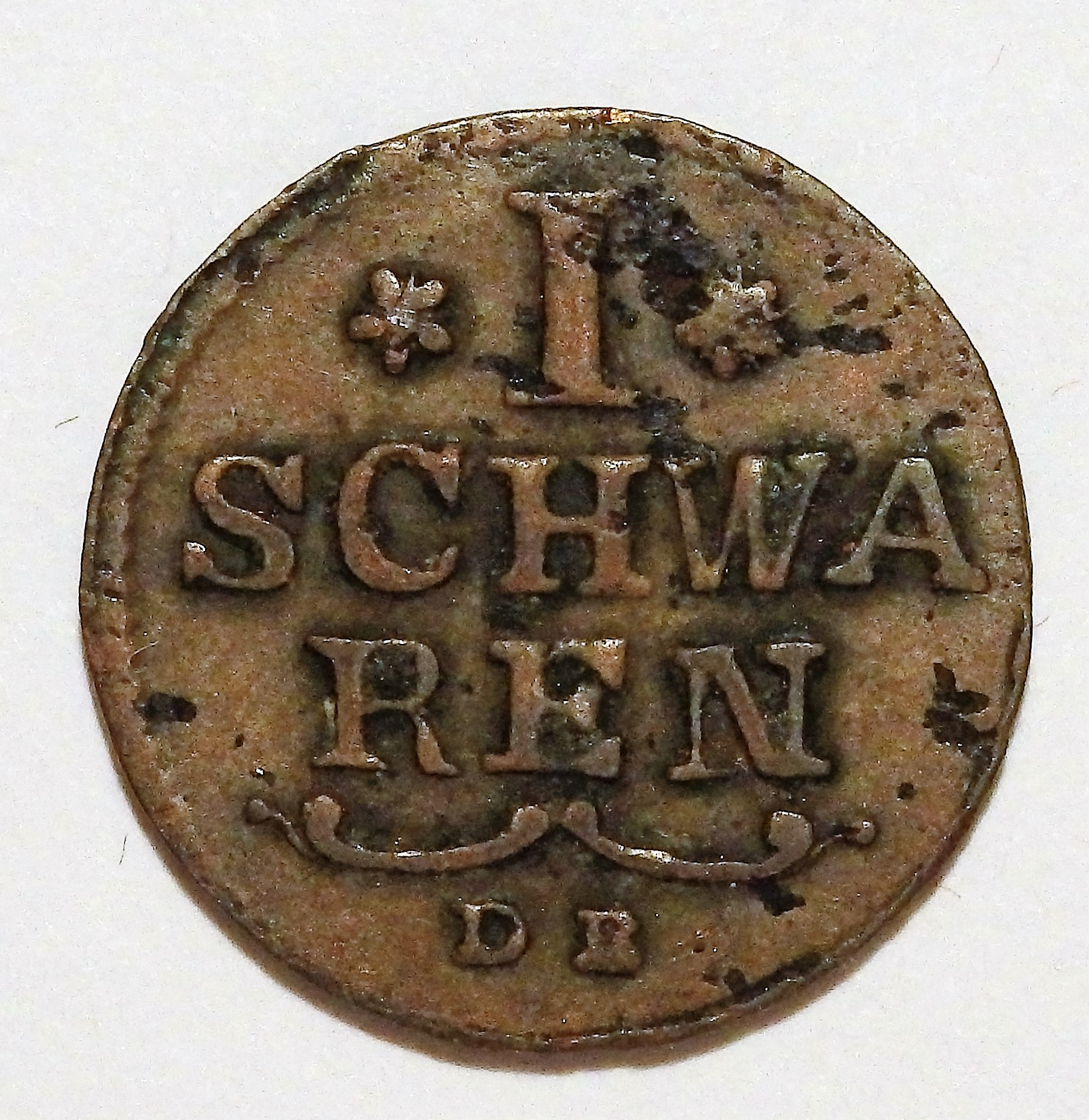
Bremen Schwaren, 1797, obverse

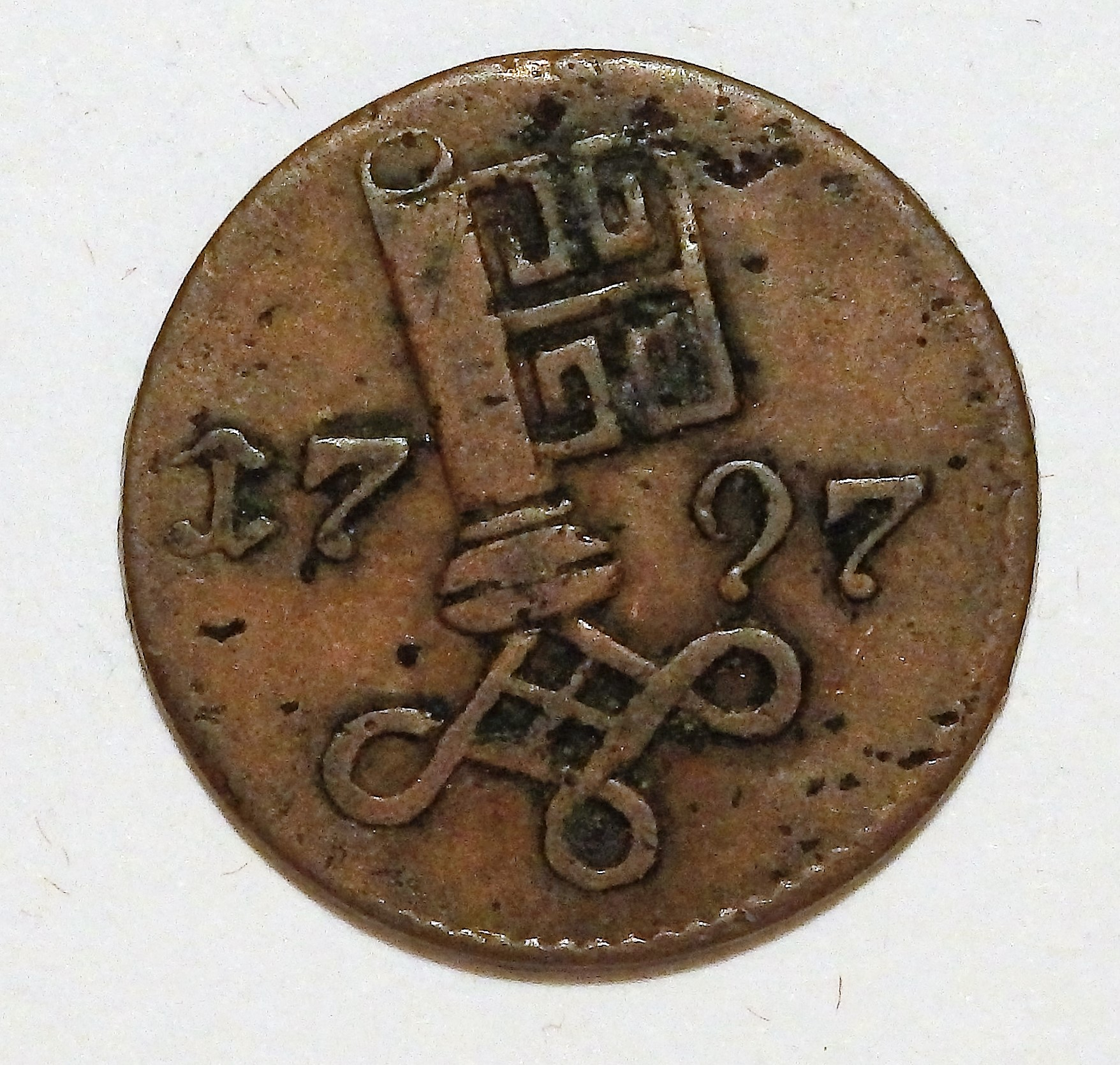
Schwaren, 1797, reverse

Some renowned coins made of copper are the Häller or Haller pfennig of Schwäbisch Hall, some centuries later called Heller, and minted throughout the country, and the Kreuzer (from Kreuz, the cross minted on the coins), minted in Austria, Switzerland, and some regions of Upper Germany.

==== 19th and 20th centuries ====
Until 1821, various smaller coin systems were in use in the Prussian provinces. Only in the provinces of Brandenburg and Westphalia was the pfennig the smallest coin in terms of value. With the Prussian small coin reform of 1821, a uniform small coin system was introduced for all Prussian provinces. To distinguish it from the pfennigs before the reform, the new denomination was called Pfenning. One thaler was no longer 288 pfennigs, but 360 Pfennings. This new ratio was also reflected on the side with the coat of arms: 360 EINEN THALER. Other states, such as Saxe-Weimar-Eisenach, minted 1 1/2 pfennig coins well into the 19th century.

In the southern German states (Baden, Württemberg, Bavaria including the Palatinate, Saxony, and other smaller ones), the value of the Pfenni(n)g was fixed at 1/240 of a Gulden by the coinage act of 1506 and that remained in force until 1871. (1 Gulden = 60 Kreuzer, 1 Kreuzer = 4 Pfenning, 1 Pfenning = 2 Heller.) The half-pfennig (Heller) was the only coin of the Gulden period that remained officially valid after the introduction of the imperial currency (because of the beer tax in Bavaria).

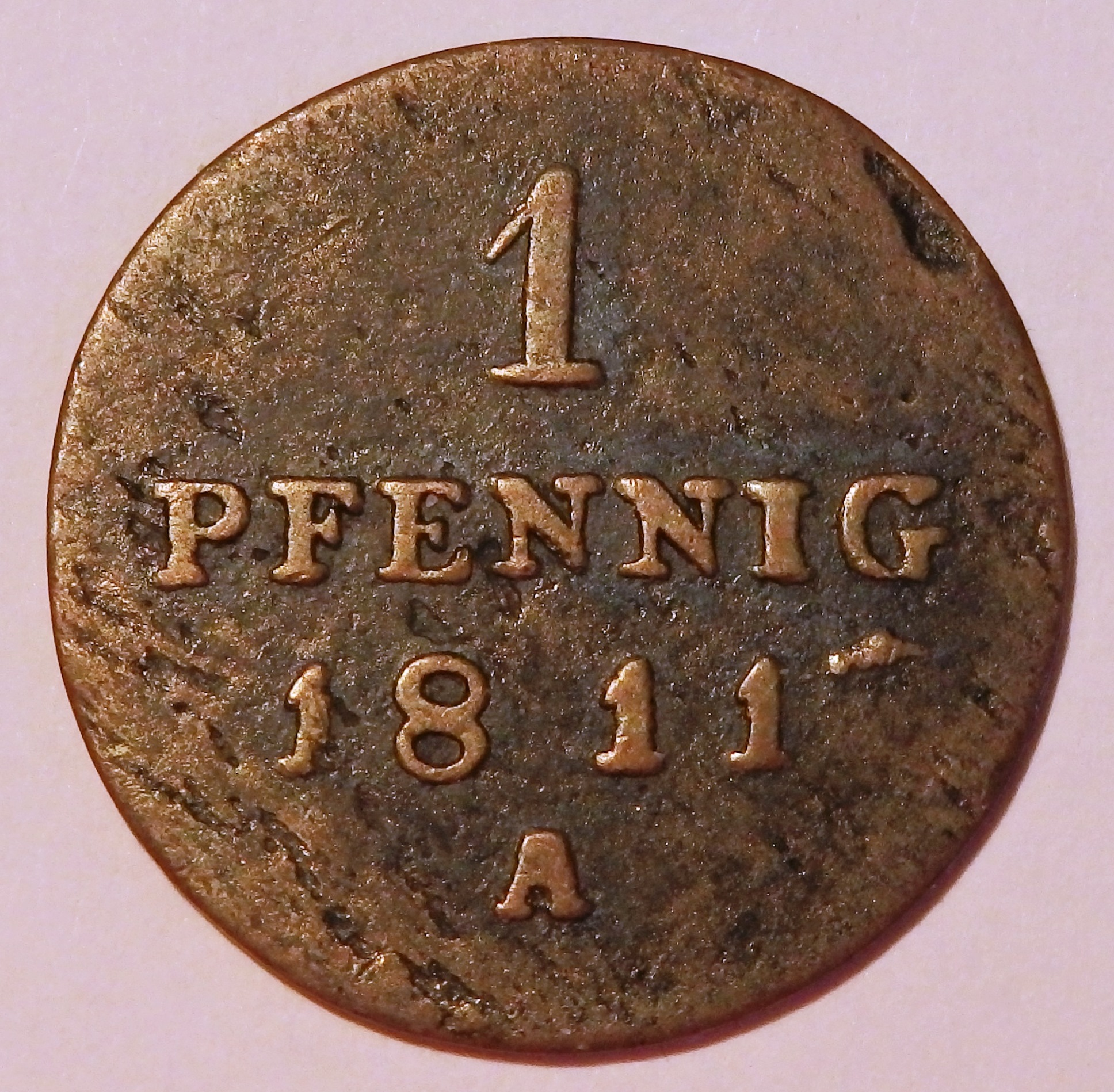
Brandenburg pfennig of 1811, reverse

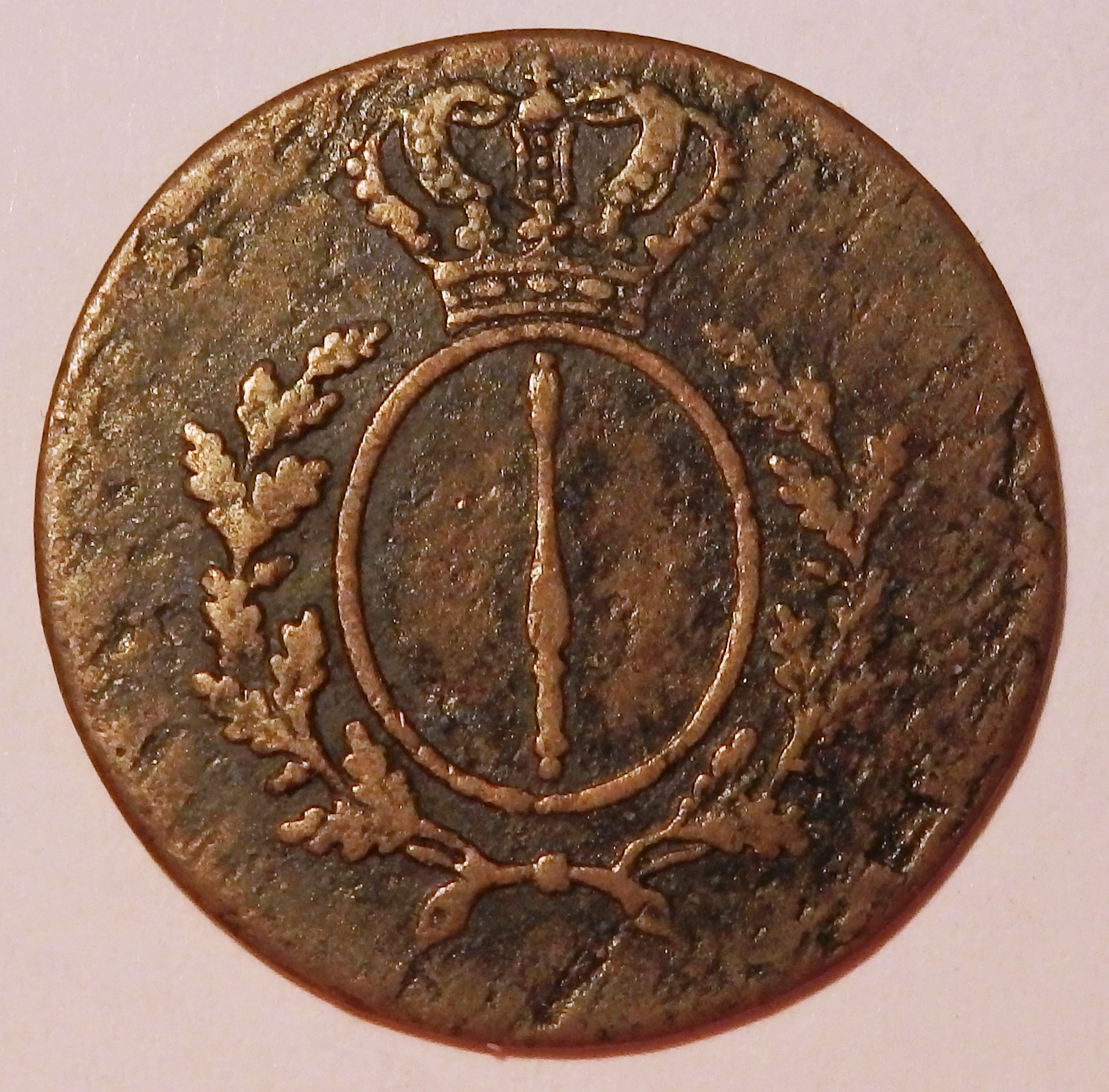
Brandenburg pfennig of 1811, obverse

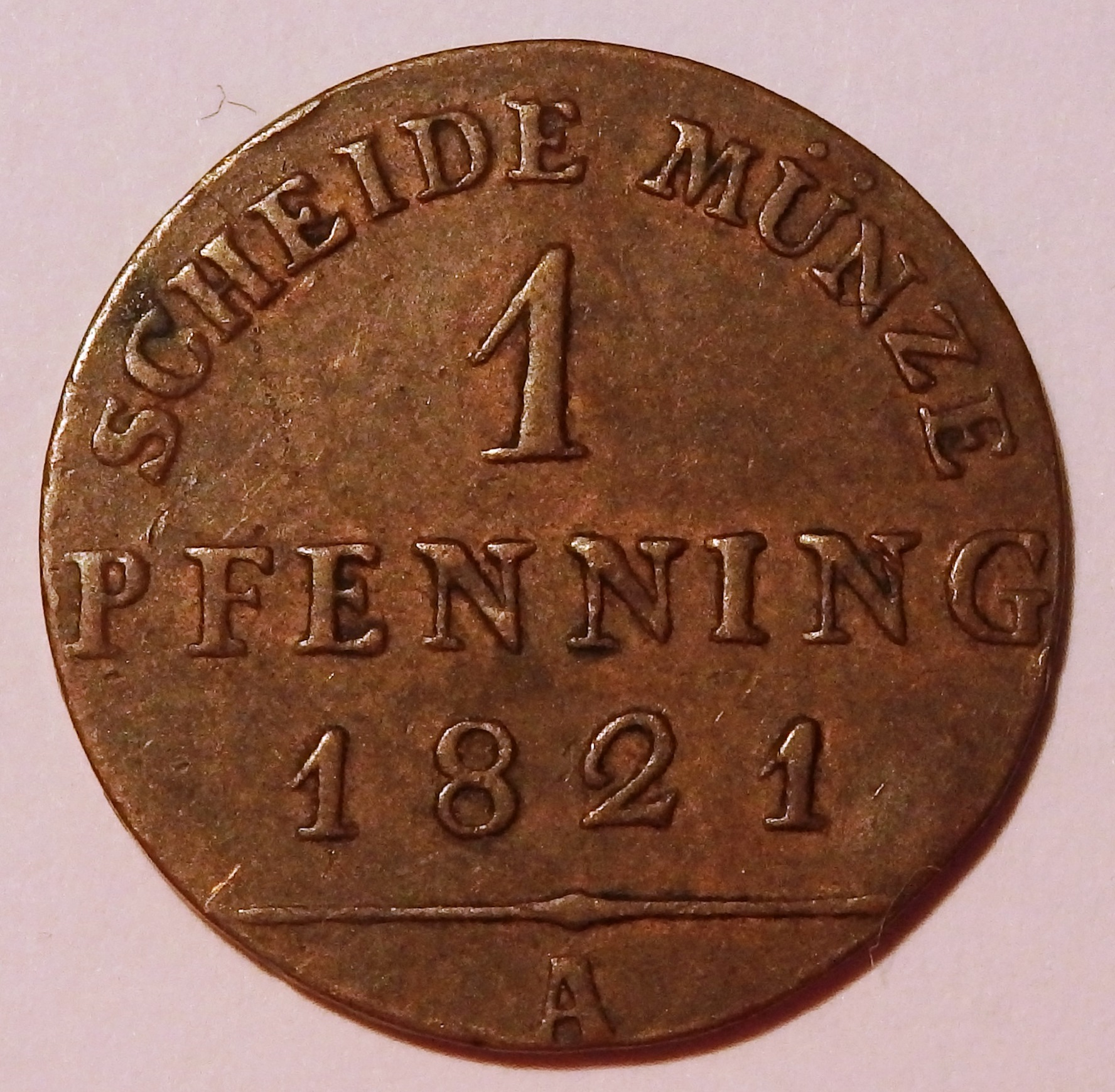
Prussian Pfenning of 1821, reverse

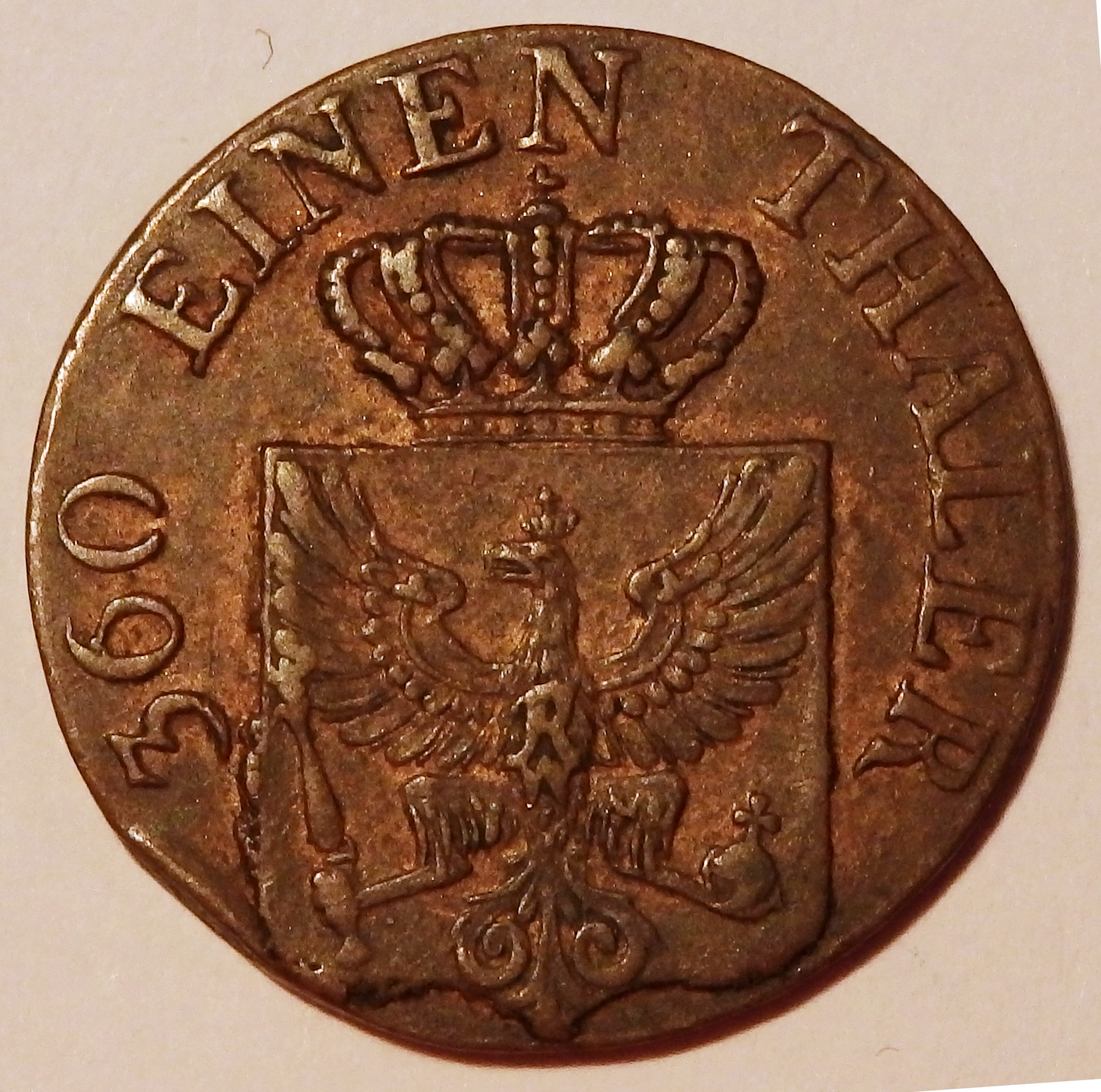
Prussian Pfenning of 1821, obverse

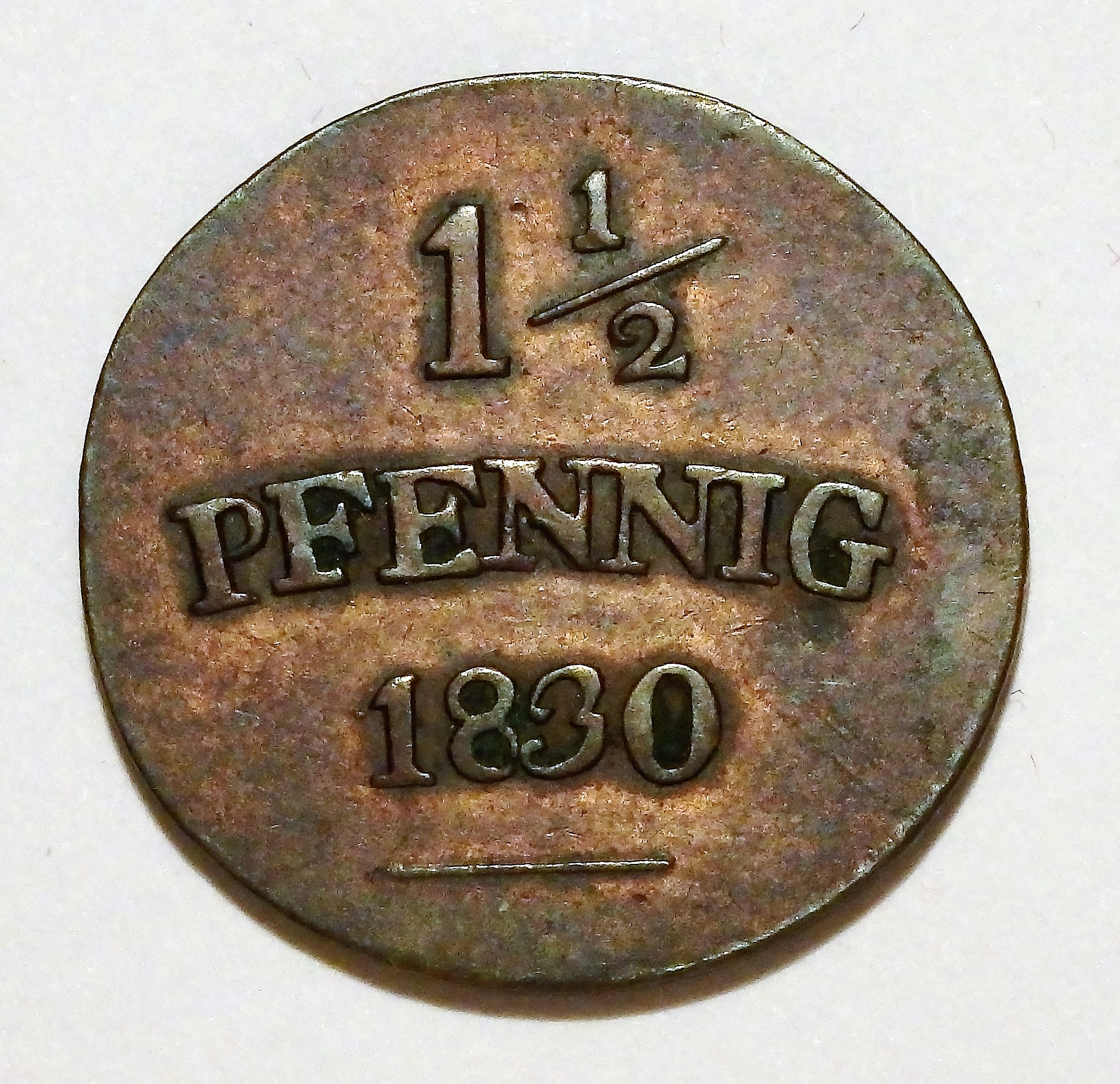
1 1/2 pfennig of 1830, Saxe-Weimar-Eisenach, reverse

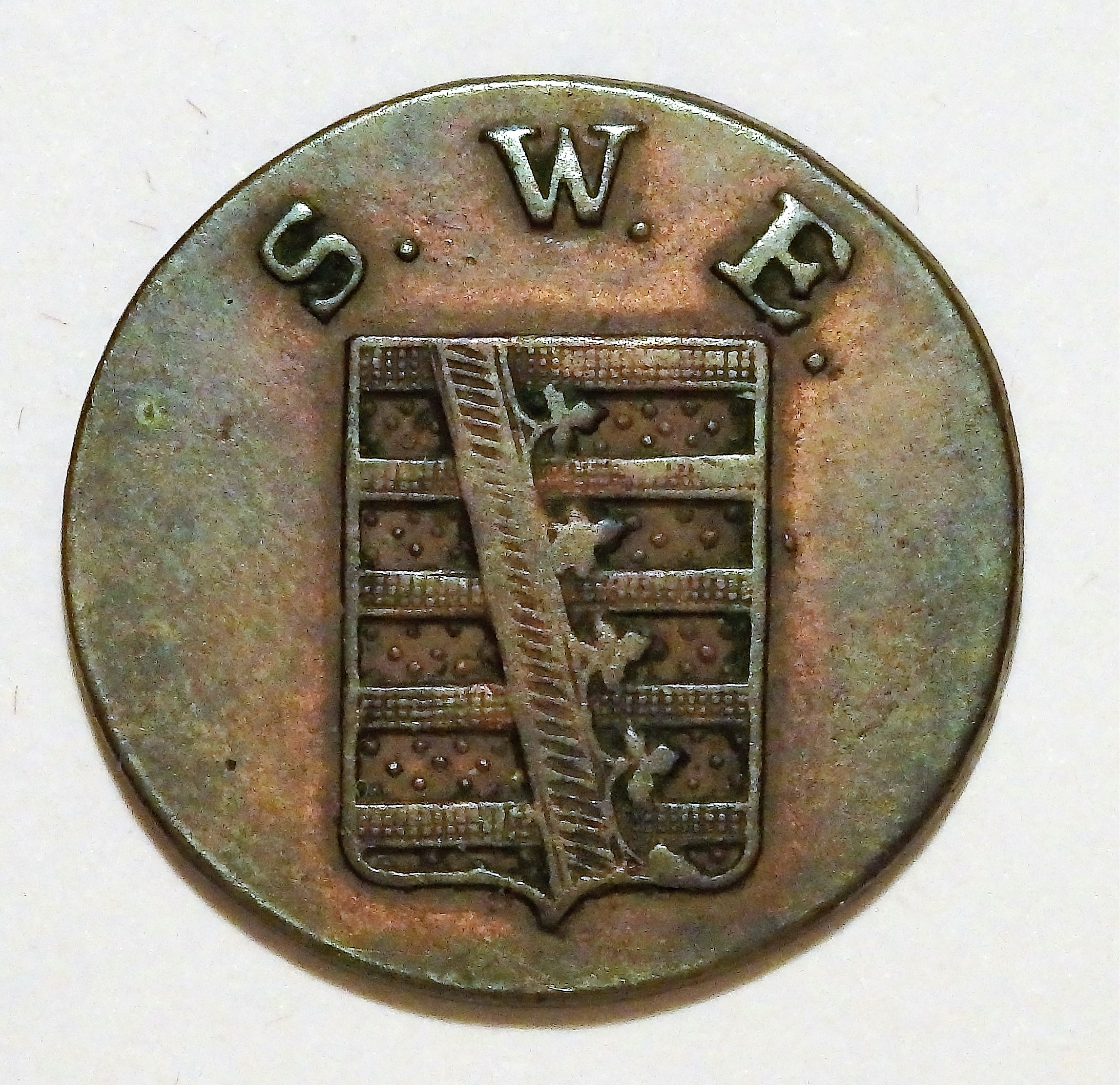
1 1/2 pfennig of 1830, obverse

In some southern German states, the term Heller was a synonym for the pfennig (e.g. in the city of Frankfurt and in the Duchy of Nassau). In Bavaria, the heller was half a penny.

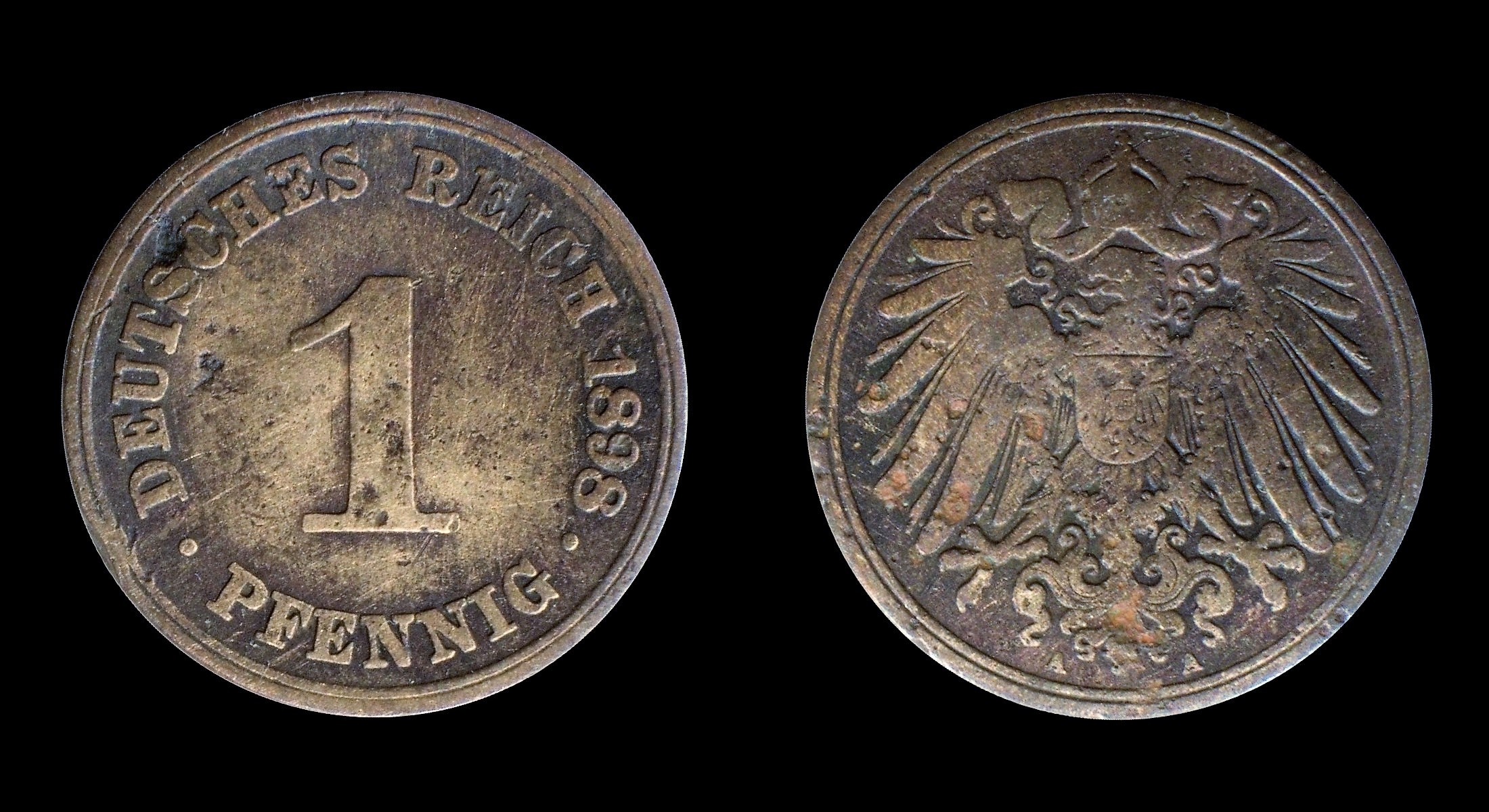
A 1 pfennig coin under the Goldmark (German Empire)

The gold mark, introduced by the German Coinage Act of 1871, was the currency of the newly founded German Empire, divided into 100 pfennigs. This partition was retained through all German currencies (including the Rentenpfennig, the Reichspfennig, and the pfennig of the Deutsche Mark) until 2001.

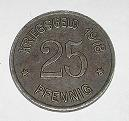
German Empire: 25 pfennig iron coin 1918. The word on the top means "wartime money".

The last West German one- and two-pfennig coins were steel with a copper coating. The five- and ten-pfennig coins were steel with a brass coating. The latter was called a Groschen, while the five-pfennig coin, half a groschen, was regionally (east of the river Elbe) also referred to as the Sechser (lit. 'en' or 'sixer'), deriving from the former duodecimal division of the groschen. All four coins had their value imprinted on the obverse and an oak tree on the reverse.

The coins of the East German mark were made of aluminium, except for the 20 pfennig coin, which was made of an aluminium copper alloy.

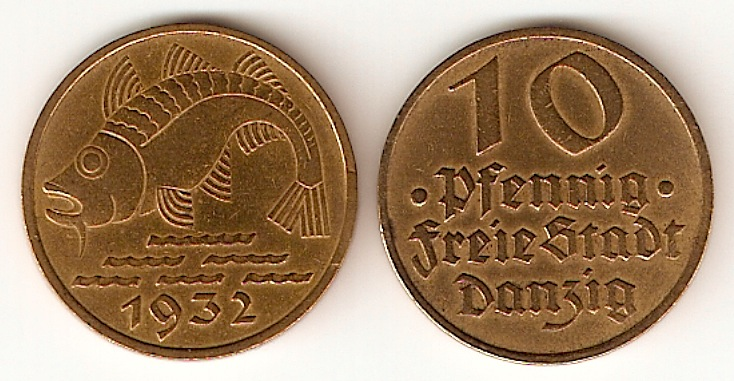
Free City of Danzig: 10 pfennig 1932

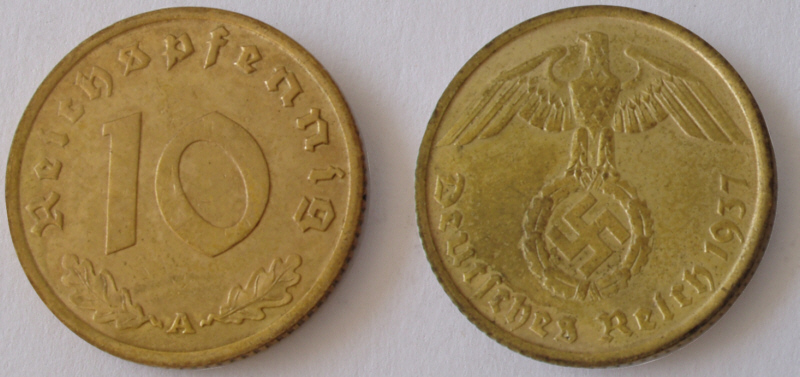
Nazi Germany: 10 Reichspfennig coin, 1937

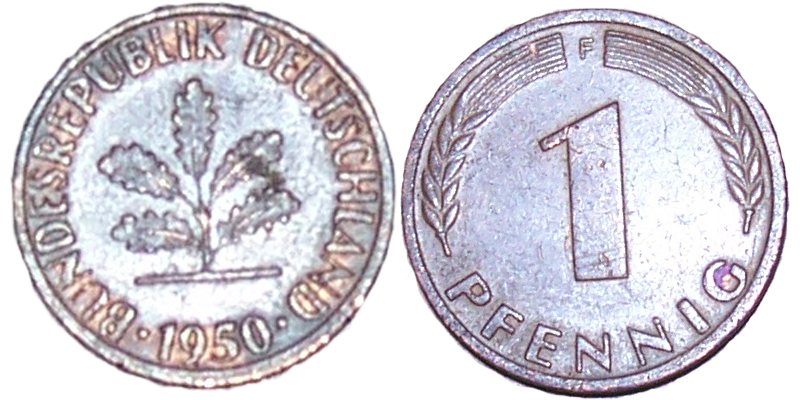
West Germany: 1 pfennig coin, 1950

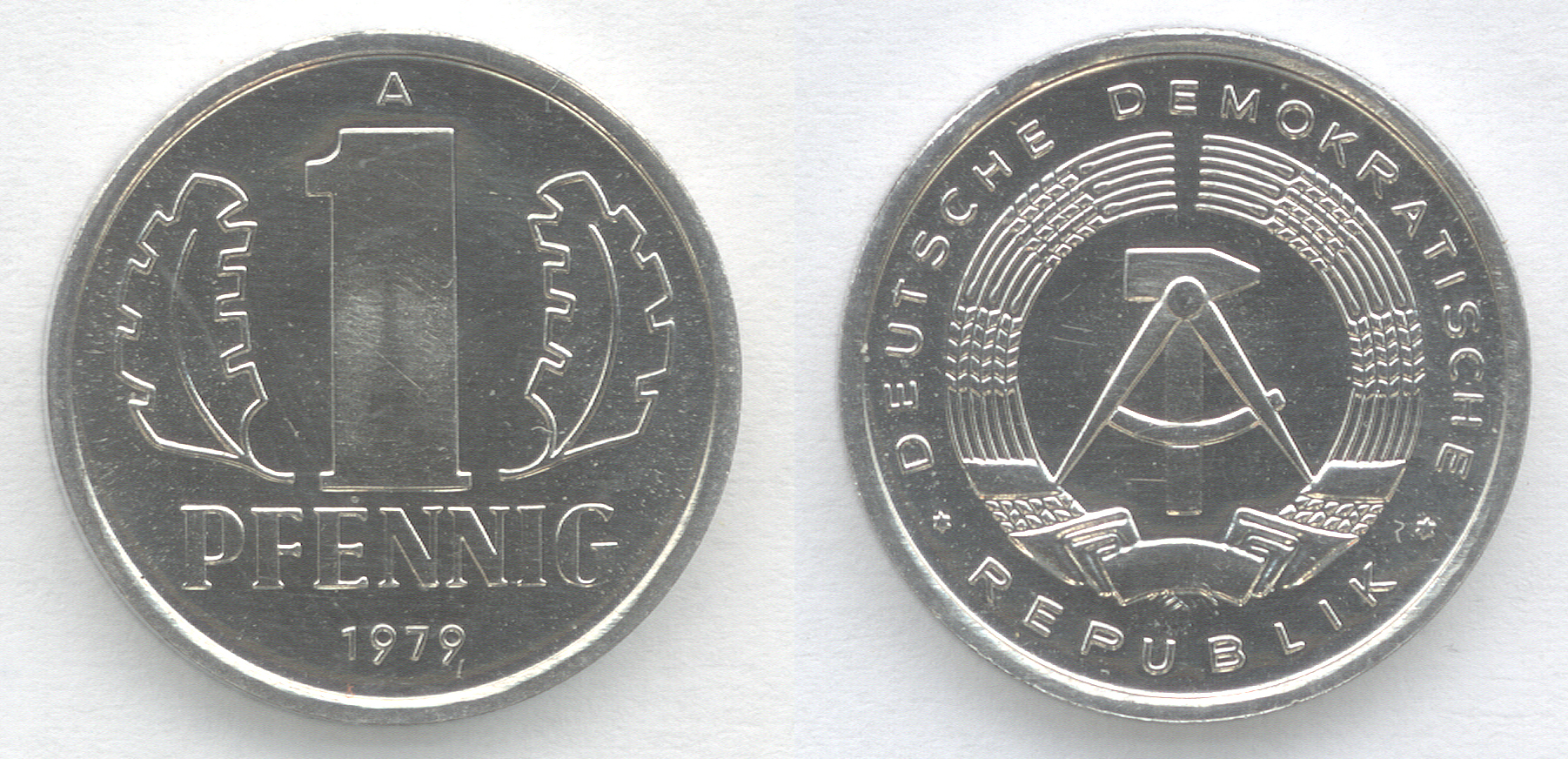
East Germany: 1 pfennig coin, 1979

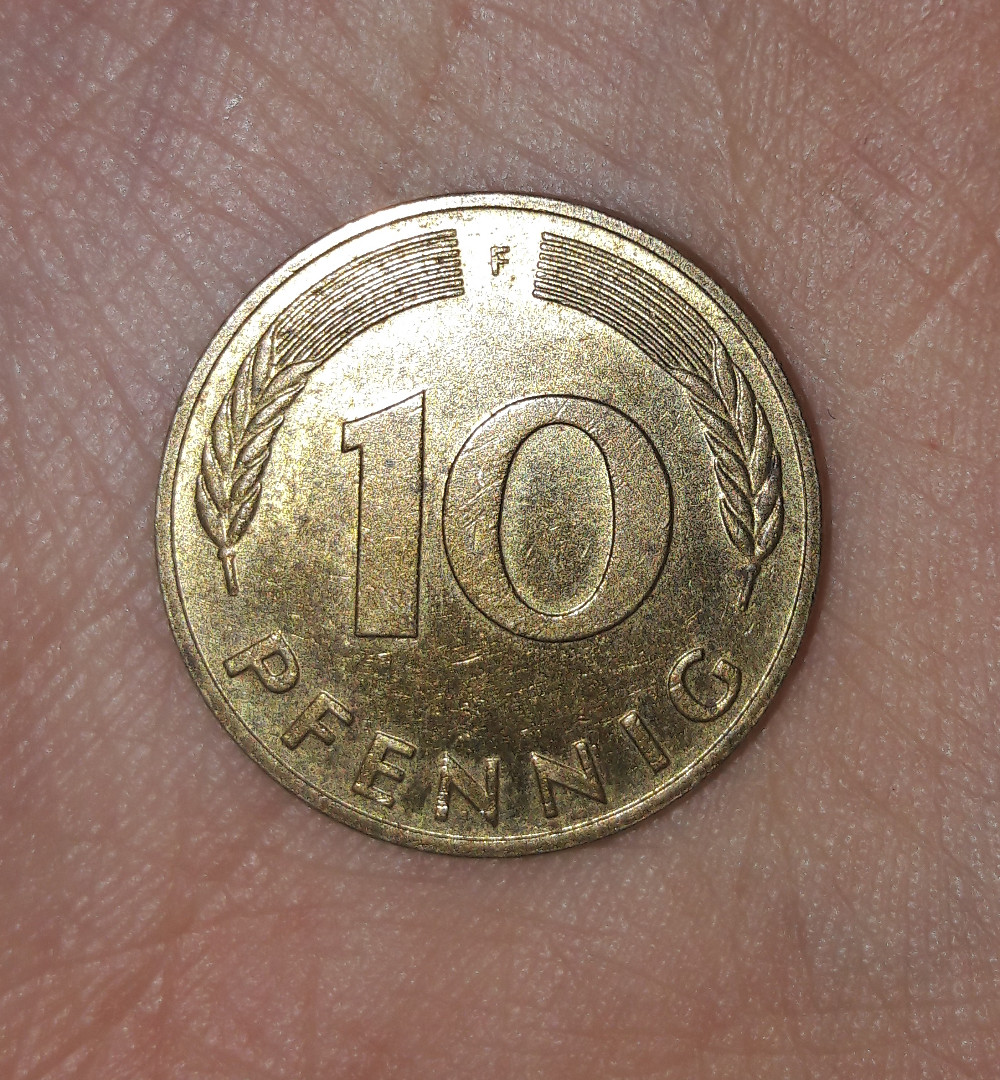
10 pfennig coin used in the Federal Republic of Germany until 2001

== Pfennig since the euro ==
After the introduction of the euro, some, mainly older, Germans tend to use the term pfennig instead of cent for the copper-coloured coins (and the term Groschen for the 10-cents-coin). The Bosnia and Herzegovina convertible mark is the only currency to use the name pfennigs in the modern day, with them being a subunit of its currency.

== Unicode ==
The pfennig ligature is defined and coded in Unicode as follows:

International Character encoding standard Unicode
| Character | Unicode Position | Unicode Title | HTML hexadecimal | HTML decimal |
|---|---|---|---|---|
| ₰ | U+20B0 | German penny sign | &#x20B0; | &#8368; |

== See also ==
=== General ===
- Bracteate
- Penny
- Denier, the French penny
- Coinage of Saxony

=== Types of pfennig ===
- Lilienpfennig
- Regional pfennig
- Roter Seufzer
- Sachsenpfennig
- Schüsselpfennig
- Weckelerpfennig
