= Stäbler (coin) =

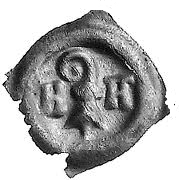
Stäbler of the city of Basel

A Stäbler or Stebler was a coin struck and issued by the city of Basel in Switzerland in 1373 after it had obtained minting rights. The coins depict the Basel staff (bishop's staff), the coat of arms of the city of Basel. They are square in shape, struck on one side only and weigh about 0.15 grams of silver fine weight. The coin design appears in high relief, while the reverse remains blank and is referred to in numismatics as a bracteate (hollow coin).

Initially, the Stäbler was worth half a Pfennig or one Haller. After the founding of the Rappenmünzbund coinage union, the name was transferred to the Rappen coin and was increasingly applied to other types of pfennig; for the different values see the article in the Swiss Idiotikon. Stäblers were also minted by other Swiss mints, but they were of lower value than the Rappenmünzbund issue. Stäblers and Rappen (Zweiling - "two-ers") were initially the only silver denominations of the Rappenmünzbund, larger financial transactions were settled with the Goldguldens. The Stäbler was used as a means of payment up until the 16th century.

== Literature ==
- Stäbler in Swiss Idiotikon, Volume X, Column 1060 ff.
- Benedikt Zäch: 'Stäbler' in German, French and Italian in the online Historical Dictionary of Switzerland.
