= Zollpfennig =

Special purpose coin

The Zollpfennig ("customs pfennig") was Pfennig coin with a special function, issued under Elector Charles Theodore (1742–1799) of the Palatinate in the years 1766, 1778 and minted in 1777 by the Landgraviate of Hesse-Darmstadt. Both were made of copper and were small or fractional coins. They served to finance the state and to equalize the value of payments between coins of different coinage standards.

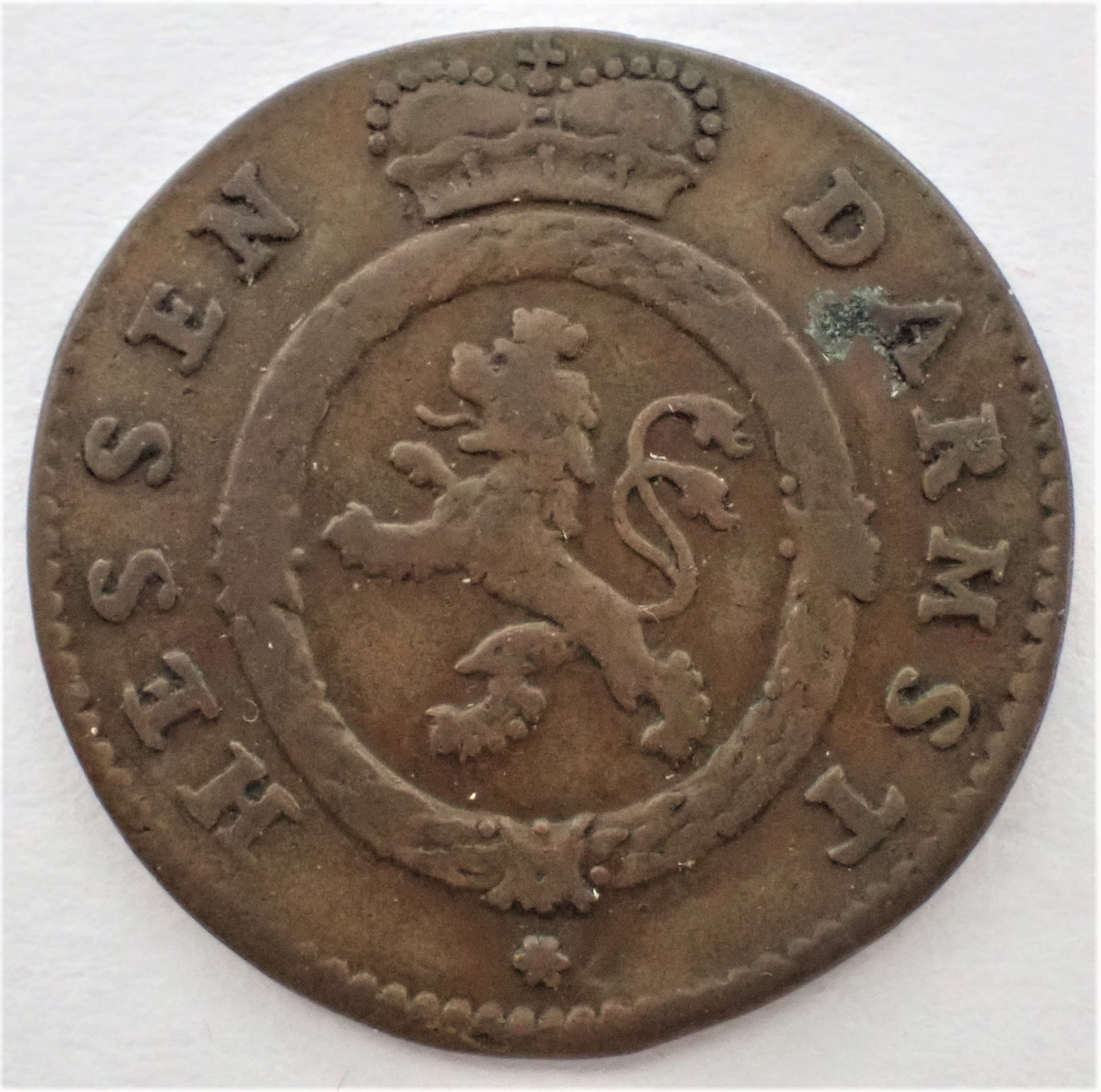
Zollpfennig, Hesse-Darmstadt, 1777, obverse

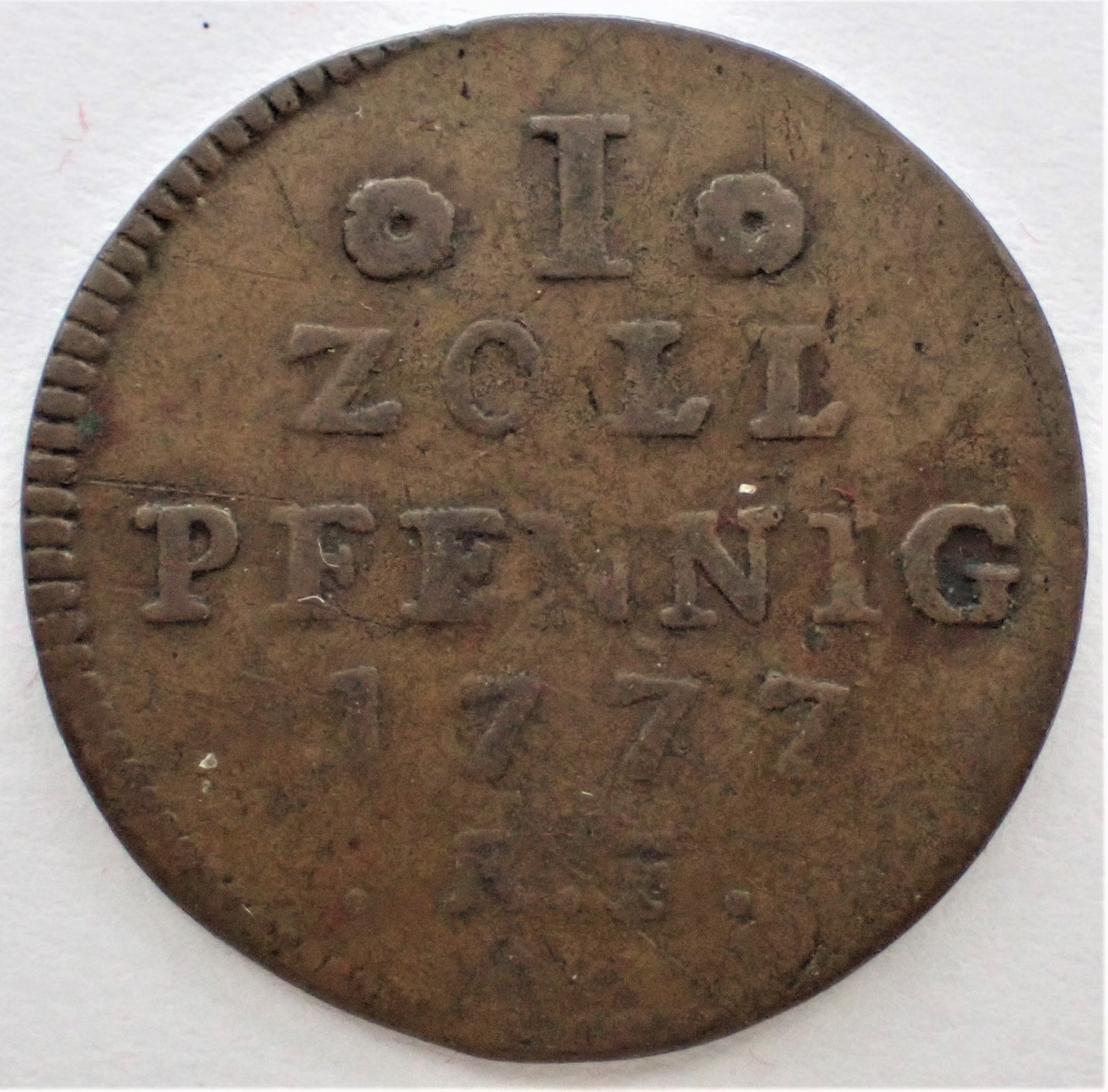
Zollpfennig, Hesse-Darmstadt, 1777, reverse

The Palatinate Zollpfennigs from 1766 and 1778 depict a crowned lion within branches and the inscription CHUR PFALZ on the obverse. The reverse is inscribed with 1 ZOLL PFENNIG and the respective year. This type of coin is cataloged under number 172 in the German coin catalogue of the 18th century under the heading "Palatinate". While the Palatinate Zollpfennig was worth 1½ pfennigs in general payment transactions, it was only valued at 1 pfennig for payments to the electoral coffers and thus served to finance the state.

The Zollpfennigs of Hesse-Darmstadt were only minted with the year 1777. The obverse depicts a crowned lion with the two-part inscription HESSEN DARMST., the reverse is stamped with the inscription I ZOLL PFENNIG and the date. The coin type is catalogued under no. 115 in the 18th century German Coin Catalogue under the Hesse-Darmstadt section. When Hesse-Darmstadt introduced the 20 gulden standard as coinage standard in 1765, her neighbouring states kept the 24 gulden standard. In the following year, Hesse-Darmstadt allowed coins minted in the 24 gulden standard for payment transactions again, but continued to demand coins corresponding to the 20 gulden standard for payments to the public coffers and customs posts. Because there were no 20 gulden coins, the Zollpfennig was introduced to compensate for payments in 20 gulden.

== Literature ==
- Helmut Kahnt, Das große deutsche Münzlexikon von A bis Z, Gietl Verlag, Regenstauf 2005
