= Weißpfennig =

Small silver coin that began to be minted from 1360 under Emperor Charles IV

The Weißpfennig (literally white penny; Latin - denarius albus) was a form of silver groschen that was circulated in the Holy Roman Empire in the Late Middle Ages. It was also known as an albus or a Rhenish groschen (rheinischer Groschen). It was minted from the second half of the 14th century onwards in the Lower Rhine region by the four Rhenish electors of the Holy Roman Empire, who set up a joint mint in 1385–86. It was intended for everyday use, whilst the gold Rhenish gulden of the same era was intended as a trade coin. Those minted in Mainz were inscribed on one side 'Mainzer Rad' ("Mainz Wheel") and were also known as Raderalbus ("Wheel albus").

== History ==
Archbishop Kuno of Trier and his nephew Archbishop Frederick of Köln had the Weißpfennig minted under the minting union (Münzverein) that they founded on 8 March 1372. The aim of this union was the minting of common gold and silver coins to a fixed fineness. The common gold coin was the gulden, which depicted Saint Peter on the obverse; the common silver coin was the Weißpfennig, which is first mentioned in a document in this treaty. The white appearance that gave the Weißpfennig its name was due to the high fineness attributed to the silver used.

== Distribution ==
Since the 'Rhenish Groschen' was very popular, it was widely used from Heidelberg on the southern border of the Palatinate lands to Moers on the Lower Rhine border and was coined by numerous Rhenish and Westphalian lords.

== Bibliography ==
- Fengler, Heinz, Gerhard Gierow and Willy Unger (1976). Transpress Lexikon Numismatik. (Berlin:(Berlin:Transpress Verlag. (in German)
- Suhle, Arthur (1974). "Die Groschen- und Goldmünzprägung im 14. und 15. Jahrhundert" In: Deutsche Münz- und Geldgeschichte von den Anfängen bis zum 15. Jahrhundert. (VEB Deutscher Verlag der Wissenschaften) (in German)
