= Otto Adelheid Pfennig =

The Otto Adelheid Pfennig (OAP) was a German coin type bearing the names of Emperor Otto III of the Holy Roman Empire and his grandmother Adelaide of Burgundy (Athalhet), which was minted soon after 983 as a regional pfennig in the Harz region. Minting took place at more than one mint in the area between Hildesheim and Quedlinburg and lasted unchanged until the middle of the 11th century.

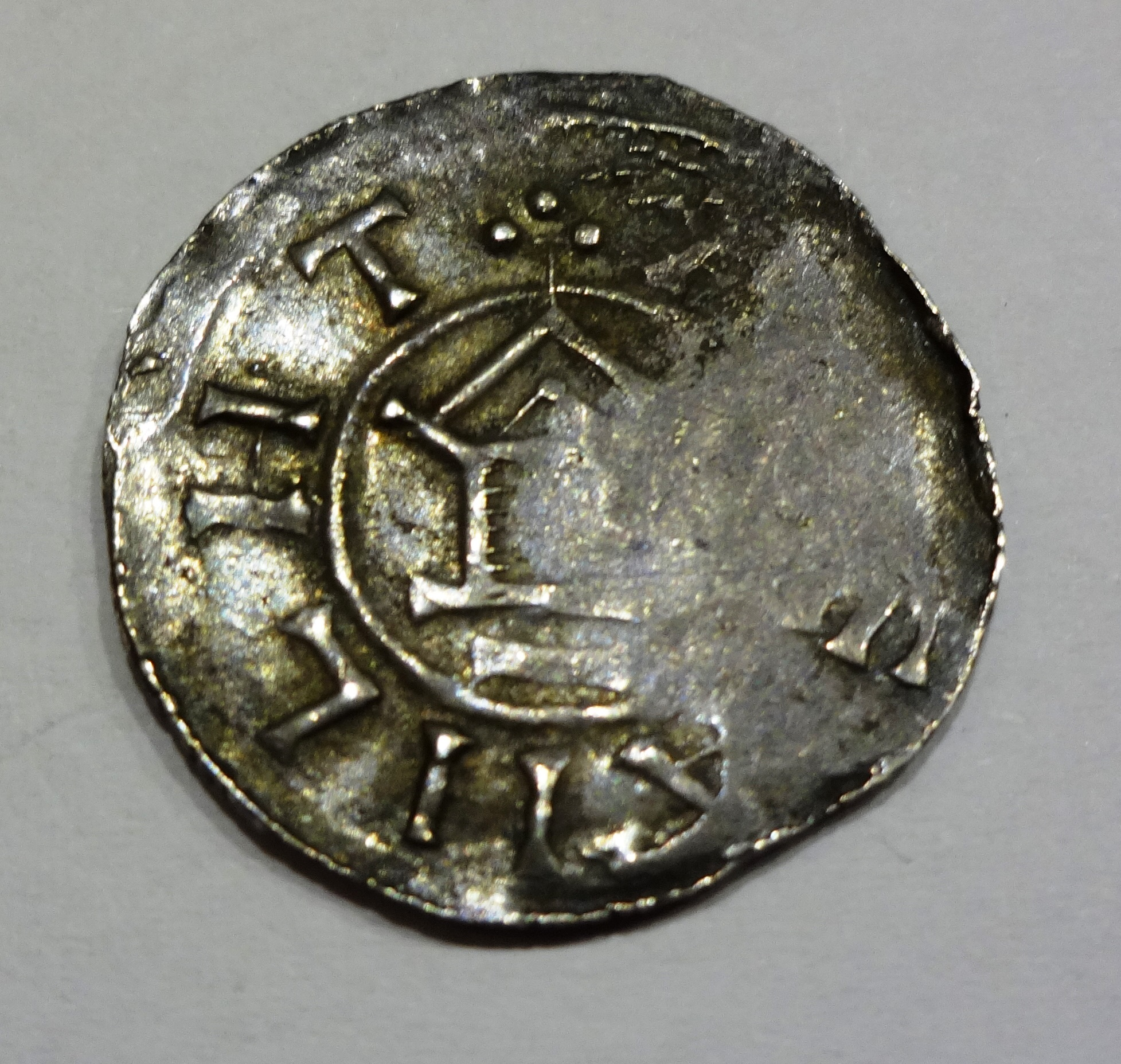
Otto Adelheid Pfennig, reverse, Goslar Mint

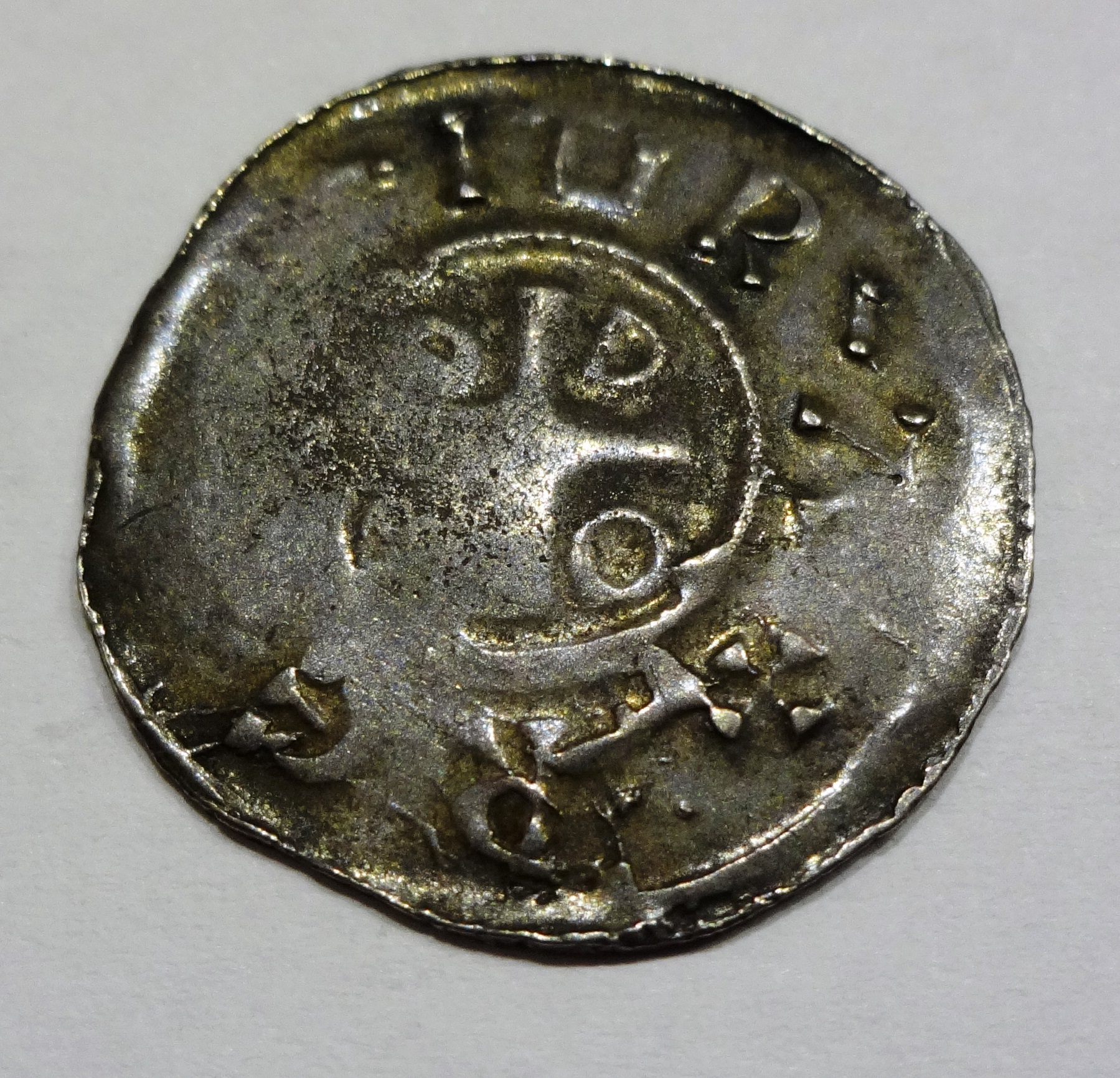
Otto Adelheid Pfennig, obverse, Goslar Mint

== Description ==
A cross is stamped on the obverse side, in the corners of which are the letters of the name Otto, here in the form "O-D-D-O", framed by the transcription DI GRA REX (for "Dei Gratia Rex" = "By the Grace of God, King"). The reverse shows a stylized wooden church with the inscription: ATEAHLHT or ATHALHET. Depending on the time of minting, the silver coins weighed around 1.5 to 1.25 g and had a diameter of around 17 –20 mm.

== Literature ==
- Vera Hatz: Zur Frage der Otto-Adelheid-Pfennige. Versuch einer Systematisierung auf Grund des schwedischen Fundmaterials. In: Commentationes de nummis saeculorum IX-XI in Suecia repertis. Vol. 1. Almqvist & Wiksell, Stockholm 1961, OCLC 174913020, pp. 105 -144.
- Gert Hatz, Vera Hatz, Ulrich Zwicker, Noe and Zofia Gale: Otto-Adelheid-Pfennige. Untersuchungen zu Münzen des 10./11. Jahrhunderts. (= Commentationes de nummis saeculorum IX-XI in Suecia repertis. Nova Series 7). Royal Swedish Academy of Letters, History and Antiquities, Stockholm 1991, ISBN 9-171-92827-8.
- Bernd Kluge: Überlegungen zu den Otto-Adelheid-Pfennigen. Stempelkritische Untersuchungen der Typen Hatz II (Dbg.1166, 1170) und AMEN (Dbg.1171). In: Commentationes de nummis saeculorum IX-XI in Suecia repertis. Nova Series 6: Sigtuna Papers, Proceedings of the Sigtuna Symposium in viking-age coinage 1–4 June 1989. Lund /. London 1990, pp. 167-181.
- Peter Ilisch: Überlegungen zur Datierung der Otto-Adelheid-Pfennigen der Stufen Hatz II, III und IV. Wiadomości Numizmatyczne 49, 2005, pp. 39-62.
- Klaus Giesen: Die Hälblinge der Otto-Adelheid-Pfennige, Fundanalyse und Stempelvergleich in: NUMMI DOCENT - commemorative publication for Peter Ilisch on the occasion of his 65th birthday on 28 April 2012, (ed.) Gerd Dethlefs, Arent Pol, Stefan Wittenbrink, Osnabrück 2012, pp. 98–110
