= Carolingian pound =

Unit of weight and coinage

The Carolingian pound (Latin: pondus Caroli, German: Karlspfund), also called Charlemagne's pound or the Charlemagne pound, was a unit of weight that emerged during the reign of Charlemagne. It served both as a trading weight and a coinage weight. It had a mass of about 408 g and was introduced as part of Charlemagne's monetary reform around AD 793/94. This stipulated that 240 denarii (= pfennigs) were to be minted from one pound weight of silver.

The units of weight that emerged over time as a result of the Carolingian monetary system and its associated pound or Karlspfund, were of great importance for large parts of Europe. The basic features of this monetary system, which was based on the Carolingian pound, continued to exist in England until 1971. Initially, the Carolingian pound was valid across the whole of the Carolingian Empire and, to a lesser extent, in the Holy Roman Empire under the Ottonian dynasty that followed. Under the Salians, who ruled from 1024, the Cologne Mark was introduced. This amounted to 576 thousandths of the Carolingian pound and became the dominant coinage weight. Similar modifications were made to trading weights at the same time.

== Origin ==
The Karlspfund is first attested by a contemporary manuscript, as well as reports from the Council of Frankfurt in 794. These say that new coins, new deniers or denars, were now to be minted in the Empire. These deniers later became known as pfennigs. The exact derivation of the target weight of the Charlemagne pound itself has yet to be clarified.

Today, the original weight of the Charlemagne pound can be determined primarily by weighing surviving Carolingian coins from the early period, although a variation of several per cent occurs. In the literature, the Karlspfund is often given 408.25 g or approximately as 408 g, The latter is the equivalent of one denier of exactly 1.7 g in weight.

== Derivatives ==
=== France ===
From the middle of the 12th century, several variants of the Carolingian pound emerged in France which were legal tender at different times.

- Paris pound (Libra parisi). The Paris pound, at almost 460 g, had been around since the time Louis the Fat and was 9/8 of the Carolingian pound.
- Tours pound. At the beginning of the 13th century, the livre tournois, the pound of the city of Tours, was used in France. This was identical to the "earlier" livre de Troyes in use at the same time in Troyes. The Livre tournois was exactly 9/10 of the Karlspfund.
- Troy pound. At the same time, a new system was created in Troyes, the "later" livre de Troyes. This was legal throughout France from 1266 at the latest, until 1 August 1793. It was officially and unambiguously also called the "livre des poids-de-marc" (Mark pound weight). It was 12/10 of the Karlspfund.

The English pound weight, which was adopted very early and directly from France, shows that the value of the Carolingian pound was a little lower in France for a long time.

The weight of the livre des poids-de-marc also corresponds very closely to one seventieth of the mass of a French cubic foot of water. So it is likely that this is why there was a slight increase in the weight measure in France. The ratio of the two is about 3136 : 3125, so only there is only a +0.35% difference.

Pound	Ratio	Numerical values	3136 : 3125	Empirical values
Livre de Troyes	6 : 5	487.71072 g	≈ 489.43 g	c. 489.5 g
Libra parisi	9 : 8	457.22880 g	≈ 458.84 g	c. 459.0 g
Carolingian pound (Karlspfund)	1 : 1	406.42560 g	≈ 407.86 g	c. 408.0 g
Livre tournois	9 : 10	365.78304 g	≈ 367.07 g	c. 367.0 g

=== England ===
The English system of Troy weights probably originates in the French market town of Troyes where English merchants traded at least as early as the early 9th century. The name troy is first attested in 1390, describing the weight of a platter, in an account of the travels in Europe of the Earl of Derby. The English weights were based on the older value of the livre de Troyes which was 12/10 of the Carolingian pound. Thus it is easy to compare them directly to the Karlspfund:

Pound	Ratio	Numerical values	Official values (1958) (Note: Because the BSI (British Standards Institution) became purely commercial, these are the identical, US NIST (National Institute of Standards and Technology) values.)
London	225 : 196	466.5600 g	466.55215200 g
Avoirdupois	125 : 112	453.6000 g	453.59237000 g
Merchant	625 : 448	437.4000 g	437.39264250 g
Carolingian pound (Karlspfund)	1 : 1	406.4256 g	(406.41876352 g)
Troy	45 : 49	373.2480 g	373.24172160 g
Tower	675 : 784	349.9200 g	349.91411400 g

The metrological numerical values only differed from their official values (1958) by about 0.0017 %. The former corresponded to an English grain of exactly 64.8 mg.

=== Holy Roman Empire ===
Many of the important weights in the German Holy Roman Empire, such as the Vienna pound, the Cologne mark and the Nuremberg apothecary's pound were derived from the Charlemagne pound. For example, the ratio of the Cologne mark to the Karlspfund is exactly 576:1000.

Weight	Ratio	Numerical values	Empirical values	Deviation
Vienna Pound	864 : 625	561.84274944 g	561.288 g	−0.099 %
Cologne Pound	144 : 125	468.20229120 g	467.6246 g	−0.123 %
Carolingian pound (Karlspfund)	1 : 1	406.42560000 g	(408.0 g)	(+0.387 %)
Apothecaries' Pound	216 : 245	358.31808000 g	357.84 g	−0.133 %
Vienna Mark	432 : 625	280.92137472 g	280.644 g	−0.099 %
Dutch Mark	378 : 625	245.80620288 g	246.0839 g	+0.113 %
Cologne Mark	72 : 125	234.10114560 g	233.8123 g	−0.123 %
The Karlspfund weighed 500 gold grains (later version), or 8,000 corn grains.

The relatively large deviation of the empirical Karlspfund of almost 0.4% - which is still within the coefficient of variation determined for old weights is due to the later French, slightly larger version.

The so-called Custom Union mark of the German Customs Union was set at 233.8555 g in 1838, i.e. only around 0.105% less than its numerical value. Cologne and Vienna marks maintained their ratio of 10 : 12. Thus in creating their derivatives, the leading metrologists of the Holy Roman Empire preserved the Carolingian pound with outstanding precision for over a thousand years.

== Carolingian pfennig ==
After the Carolingian monetary reform, the schilling (lat. solidus) was initially only a coin of account, the unminted gold equivalent of 12 silver denarii (denarius = pfennig). A schilling was the equivalent of 1/20th of a Carolingian pound in silver weight. At 12 pfennigs to the schilling, Carolingian silver pfennigs were actually minted from a pound of silver 240.

For historical units of length, the coefficient of variation is generally accurate to within ± 0.2%. In ancient and medieval units of weight, a range of about (1.002^{3} −1) = 3/500 can be used. The ratio 126 : 125 and its reciprocal value represents the higher metrological precision requirements of medieval weights.

Coefficients of variation become considerably smaller from around the Renaissance period. In addition, a distinction must be made between the actual and known values of the dimensions themselves and the tolerances that inevitably occur in "mass production". At that time, purely for technical reasons, the variation was no better than, for a pfennig, 1.6 to 1.8 g.

Pound weight	Comma	Pfennig weight	Qualification of the minted weight	Cubic foot of water
409.6770048 g	126 : 125	1.70698752 g	Overweight Carolingian Pfennig	≈ 297.1 mm
409.6770048 g	126 : 125	1.70698752 g	Heavier weighted Carolingian Pfennig	≈ 297.1 mm
408.2400000 g	225 : 224	1.70100000 g	Heavier weighted Carolingian Pfennig	≈ 296.7 mm
408.2400000 g	225 : 224	1.70100000 g	True weighted Carolingian Pfennig	≈ 296.7 mm
406.4256000 g	1 : 1	1.69344000 g	True weighted Carolingian Pfennig	≈ 296.3 mm
404.6192540 g	224 : 225	1.68591360 g	True weighted Carolingian Pfennig	≈ 295.9 mm
404.6192540 g	224 : 225	1.68591360 g	Lighter weighted Carolingian Pfennig	≈ 295.9 mm
403,2000000 g	125 : 126	1,68000000 g	Lighter weighted Carolingian Pfennig	≈ 295,5 mm
403,2000000 g	125 : 126	1,68000000 g	Underweight Carolingian Pfennig	≈ 295,5 mm

== Weight of the Carolingian pound ==
The weight given for the Carolingian pound varies slightly in the literature for the following reasons:

- 406 ½ grams is a good approximation of the weight of the Carolingian pound. Its only disadvantage is that the denarius with a value of 1.69375 g has a five-digit number after the decimal point.
- 405 g equates to four digits on the right side of the denarius. This value is based on the English weight system.
- 406 g would give a period value for the denarius and is based on the German Customs Union mark.
- 408 g is slightly high and equates to 10/12 of the old French pound. It equates to a single digit decimal point for the denarius.
- 408.24g is sometimes used and may also be rounded to 408.25 g.
- 406.4256 grams is an average that represents a modern overall rounding of all weights, including those derived from the Carolingian pound. However, it does not mean that Carolingian metrologists could determine their pound value to a precision of 1/10 mg nor that modern research has determine the historical value to that level of precision.
