= Schilling (unit) =

Historical European measure of numbers, volume and weight

As well as being the name of a coin, the Schilling was an historical unit in three areas of measurement: numbers, volume and weight. It can be regarded as a European measure, because it was used in Bohemia, Bavaria, Silesia, Austria and Lusatia.

In Bohemian mines it was a measure of volume that corresponded to 5 wheelbarrows. The schilling was determined as follows:

- 1 schilling = 12 leather skins filled with water = 480 Prague pints
- 18 schillings = 1 quantity (Losung) of water

In Regensburg the measure was applied to salt. In Bavaria, for example, it was used as a number and a weight.

- 1 schilling salt = 40 'slices' (Salzscheiben) (Note: A salt slice was a standard container of salt in retail ready form.)
- 8 schillings = 1 Pfund ("pound") of salt

In Austria a schilling corresponded to the number 30 and in Silesia and Lusatia, the number 12. In the regional dialect it was called a Schilger in Silesia and a Schilger or Schilk in Lusatia.

240 pfennigs were minted from the 367 g Carolingian pound of silver. A schilling was determined to be twelve pfennigs, but was initially not an actual coin.

== Literature ==
- Joachim Heinrich Campe: Wörterbuch der deutschen Sprache. Volume 4, Brunswick: Schulbuchhandlung, 1810, p. 141
