= Lilienpfennig =

Medieval coin from Strasbourg

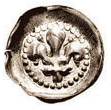
Strasbourg Lilienpfennig

The Lilienpfennig was a type of Late Medieval pfennig from the German Free Imperial City of Strasbourg which was stamped on one side with the image of a fleur-de-lys.

These silver pfennigs were the forerunners of the bowl-shaped Schüsselpfennig and were struck from the beginning of the 14th century. They had a diameter of 14 to 17 mm and weighed about 0.32 to 0.45 g. The Lilienpfennigs were one of the so-called 'eternal pfennigs' (Ewiger Pfennig) because, unlike most bracteates, they did not have to be exchanged regularly for a fee.

The planchet used for striking the coin was larger than the coin die itself, resulting in a broad, unstamped perimeter that bent up like a plate due to the die pressure. These small convex coins were easier to handle in payment transactions than their small flat-faced counterparts. It is also recorded that the upturned rim was a protection against clipping at that time.

The small balls in the design of the heraldic lily are the stamens of the lily. Sometimes their stalks are recognizable. The coin design is set in a circle of 'pearls'.

== Literature ==
- Helmut Kahnt: The big coin dictionary from A to Z., Regenstauf 2005
- Heinz Fengler, Gerd Gierow, Willy Unger: "Transpress Encyclopedia Numismatics", Berlin 1976
