= Ewiger Pfennig =

Type of coin

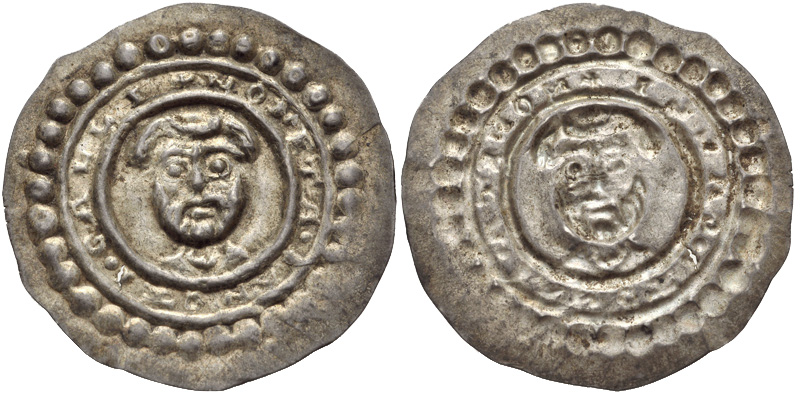
Switzerland, St. Gallen (Abbey), Ulrich IV (1167–1199), Ewiger Pfennig (Runder Pfennig), head of Saint Gallus, diameter 23 mm, weight 0.47 g

The Ewiger Pfennig or eternal penny (Latin: denarius perpetuus) was a coin of the regional pfennig period (bracteate period), which was minted until the late medieval groschen time. These coins are mostly of the Hohlpfennig or "hollow pfennig" type which, unlike bracteates, had to be exchanged regularly for a fee but were not subject to annual recall of coins in circulation, the Münzverruf.

== History ==
=== Recall, renewal and exchange ===
Each year, bracteate pfennigs had to be exchanged for a fee, usually twelve old ones for nine or ten new ones. The old ones were declared invalid, recalled (Verrufung) and replaced by coins with new images. The surplus went to cover minting costs and make a profit. An example of how the exchange was enforced is provided by Freiberg's municipal law:

Swenne die munzmeister nuwe pfennige uzwerfen, so sullen si di alden verbieten lazen. Die mugen dan noch gen vircehn Tage ane vare. Danach mugen si si brechen, wo si si vinden fu dem marcte.

Translation:

Whenever the mintmaster issues new pfennigs, they should have the old ones banned. They may then be used for fourteen days. After which they must be broken, if they are found at the market.

The pfennig was only valid in the region or city where it was struck. Trading at the market was only permitted with local coins, the place of manufacture of which was usually identical to the market place. Anyone who came from another currency area to trade had to exchange the coins they had brought with them for common ones at a loss. The exchange fee corresponded to a wealth tax of 25% for exchanging Freiberg pfennigs in the Meissen currency area, for example. The exchange fee was part of the mintmaster's income. In the Görlitz town records (Stadtbuch) of 1305 one reads that for an interest-free loan of 100 Marks of silver the mintmaster for the March of Brandenburg, Henry of Salza, promised not to break the coins at the weekly markets anymore (to make them unusable for trading). However, he had to be forced by a court to keep the agreement. Finally, the city of Görlitz bought the minting rights from the sovereign.

=== Introduction of the Ewiger Pfennig ===
In order to create stable conditions for trade and commerce, the trading cities were mainly interested in taking the coinage into their own hands in order to mint the Ewiger Pfennig, a permanent coin, and thus to eliminate the annual exchange of coins and associated fees, the territorially restricted validity of the bracteates and the constant depreciation of coins.

The frequent shortage of coins on the part of the mint lords gave many cities the opportunity to lease the mints from their sovereigns and later to acquire them through purchase. Examples are:

- 1179: Cologne was given the mint by Archbishop Philip as an enfeoffment for 1000 Marks of silver
- 1272: Stade bought the right to mint coins.
- 1291 or 1354: Erfurt, own coinage
- 1293: Hamburg leased the mint from the Count of Holstein, in 1325 Hamburg owned the right to mint.
- 1293: Lüneburg received the right to mint coins.
- 1295: Constance bought the right to mint coins.
- 1296: Brunswick received the mint as a fief, 1412 as property.
- 1296: Strasbourg, own minting, here the forerunners of the Schüsselpfennigs were minted as Ewiger Pfennigs, e.g. B. the Lilienpfennigs.
- 1325: Stralsund and Rostock received the right to mint coins.
- 1332: Hanover together with the knighthood received the mint as property.
- 1369: In the Margraviate of Brandenburg, several cities, including Berlin, Brandenburg and Stendal, paid a one-time settlement to the Margrave and received the right to mint coins in return for minting the Ewiger Pfennig.
- 1373: Basel, own coinage. The newly elected bishop, John of Vienne enfeoffed the right to mint coins for 4,000 gulden. Hollow pfennigs were issued with the bishop's crozier of Basle as a coin image.

After the mints were taken over, new coins were usually minted. However, since no comprehensive regulations were implemented between the cities and states, coin devaluation and debasement could not be eliminated.

Ewiger Pfennigs of the hollow (Hohlpfennig) type, diameter 19 to 21 mm, weight 0.32 to 0.54 g are shown in the following pictures:

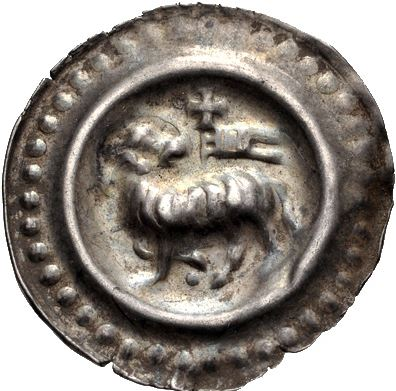
Switzerland, Abbey of St. Gallen, minted from about 1273

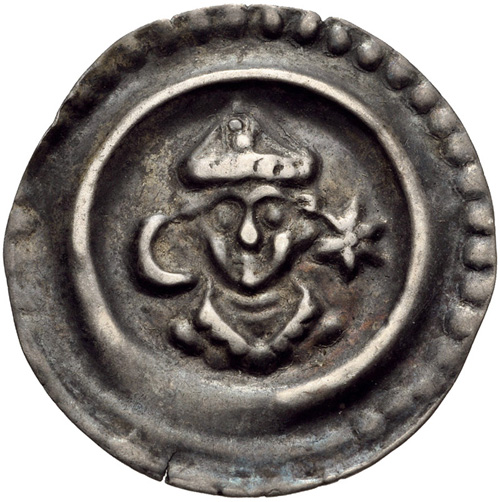
Bishopric of Constance, Bishop Henry II of Klingenberg (1293–1306)

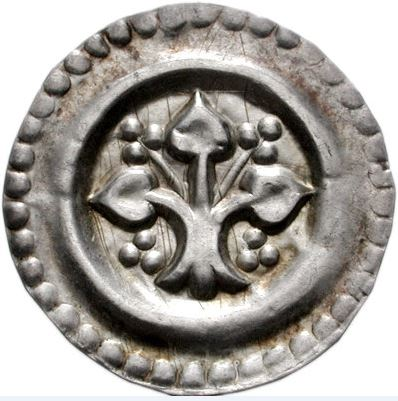
Lindau, Royal Mint, minted 1295 to 1335

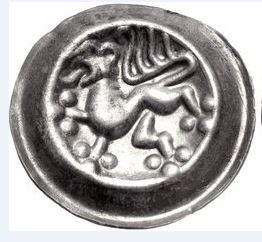
Brunswick (city), minted 1296 to 1498

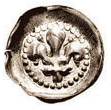
Strasbourg, Lilienpfennig, forerunner of the Schüsselpfennig, c. 1400

==== Berlin Mint ====
The opportunity to introduce the eternal penny was

[...] when here first the countryside and towns of the Mittelmark bought the mint from Elector Otto for 6,500 silver marks in 1369: that was how this town belonged, for the time being, to the Berlin mintmaster, also among those who were still entitled to strike pfennigs and scherfs and received a letter of protection from the Elector. With this minting right, the so-called eternal penny [Ewiger Pfennig] was introduced […]. Before 1369 it had been the norm in coinage that, in order to prevent the coin from deteriorating and still cover one's costs along with a considerable profit, coins were renewed annually and the pfennigs struck were only valid for one year. At the end of this period the mintmaster had to exchange them for new coins and generally lost a quarter. […] and then in 1369 this annual renewal stopped completely. A Spandow pfennig, [...] was a hollow coin, on which a burgonet and mace was portrayed along with part of the town's coat of arms.

— Friedrich L. Fischbach: Historische politisch-geographisch- und militärische Beyträge die Königlich-Preußischen und benachbarten Staaten betreffend. Des dritten Theils zweeter Band. Berlin, 1785.] Darin: Diplomatische Geschichte der Stadt und Festung Spandau, Münzgerechtigkeit, p. 405.

In 1369, Margrave Otto VIII (1365–1373) left the minting of the Ewiger Pfennig to the estates in the mint districts of Stendal and Berlin for a one-off payment. However, after just a few years, the coinage that had been guaranteed "forever" was abolished. Emperor Charles IV bought the March of Brandenburg from the Wittelsbach margrave in 1373 and reorganized the coinage system. The hollow coin named by Fischbach with a burgonet as a coin image However, this does not correspond to the denarius struck on both sides with the Berlin Bear, which is known as the Ewiger Pfennig instead of this hollow coin. More recent scholarship, however, has not ruled out that the Helmpfennig could be the Berlin Ewiger Pfennig.
