= Bracteate =

Struck metal pendant medallion, or a coin made in imitation of these

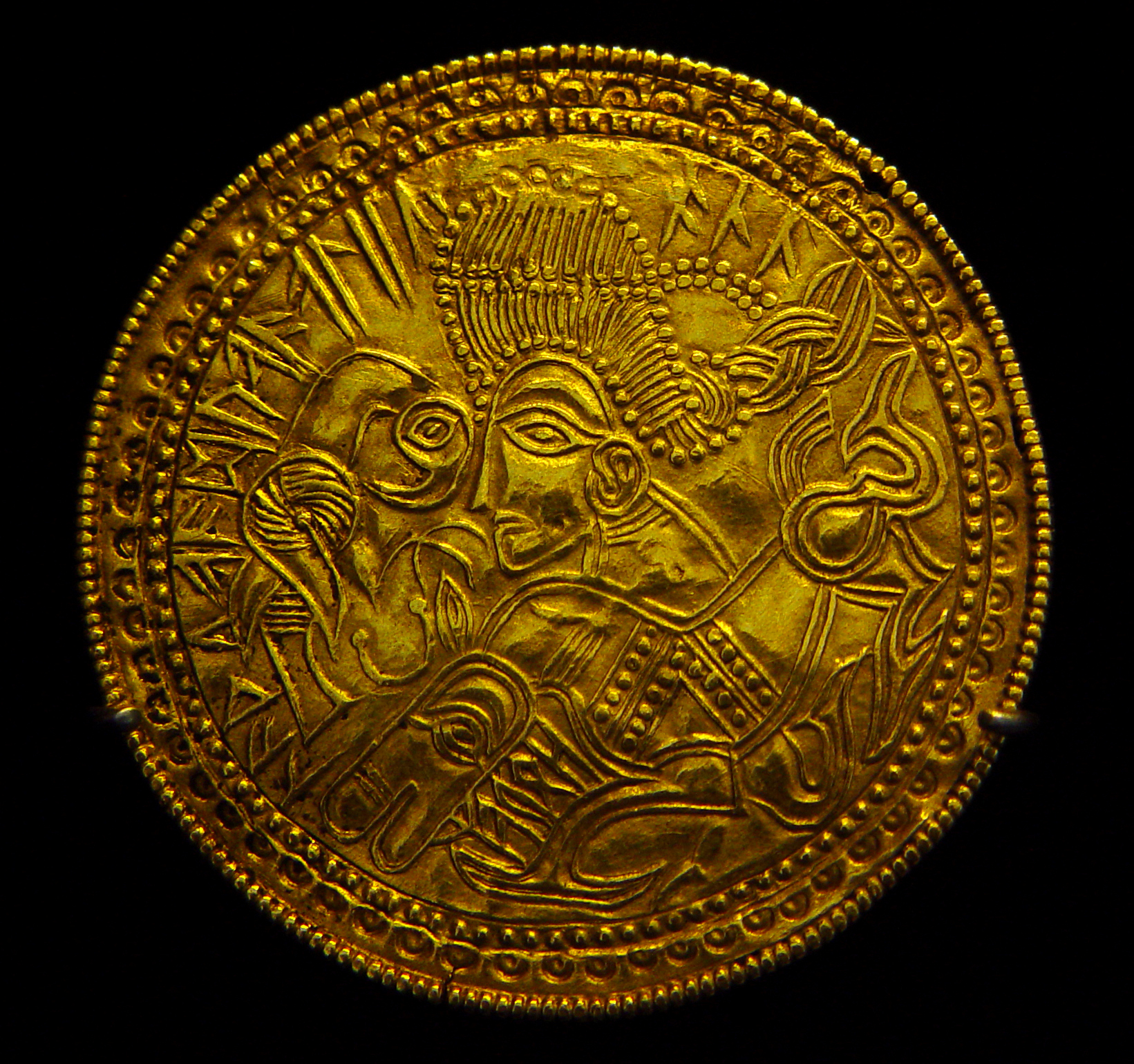
Bracteate DR BR42 bearing the inscription Alu and a figure on a horse

A bracteate (from the Latin bractea, a thin piece of metal) is a flat, thin, single-sided gold medal worn as jewelry that was produced in Northern Europe predominantly during the Migration Period of the Germanic Iron Age (including the Vendel era in Sweden). Bracteate coins are also known from the medieval kingdoms around the Bay of Bengal, such as Harikela and Mon city-states. The term is also used for thin discs, especially in gold, to be sewn onto clothing in the ancient world, as found for example in the ancient Persian Oxus treasure, and also later silver coins produced in central Europe during the Early Middle Ages.

== Gold bracteates from the Migration Period ==
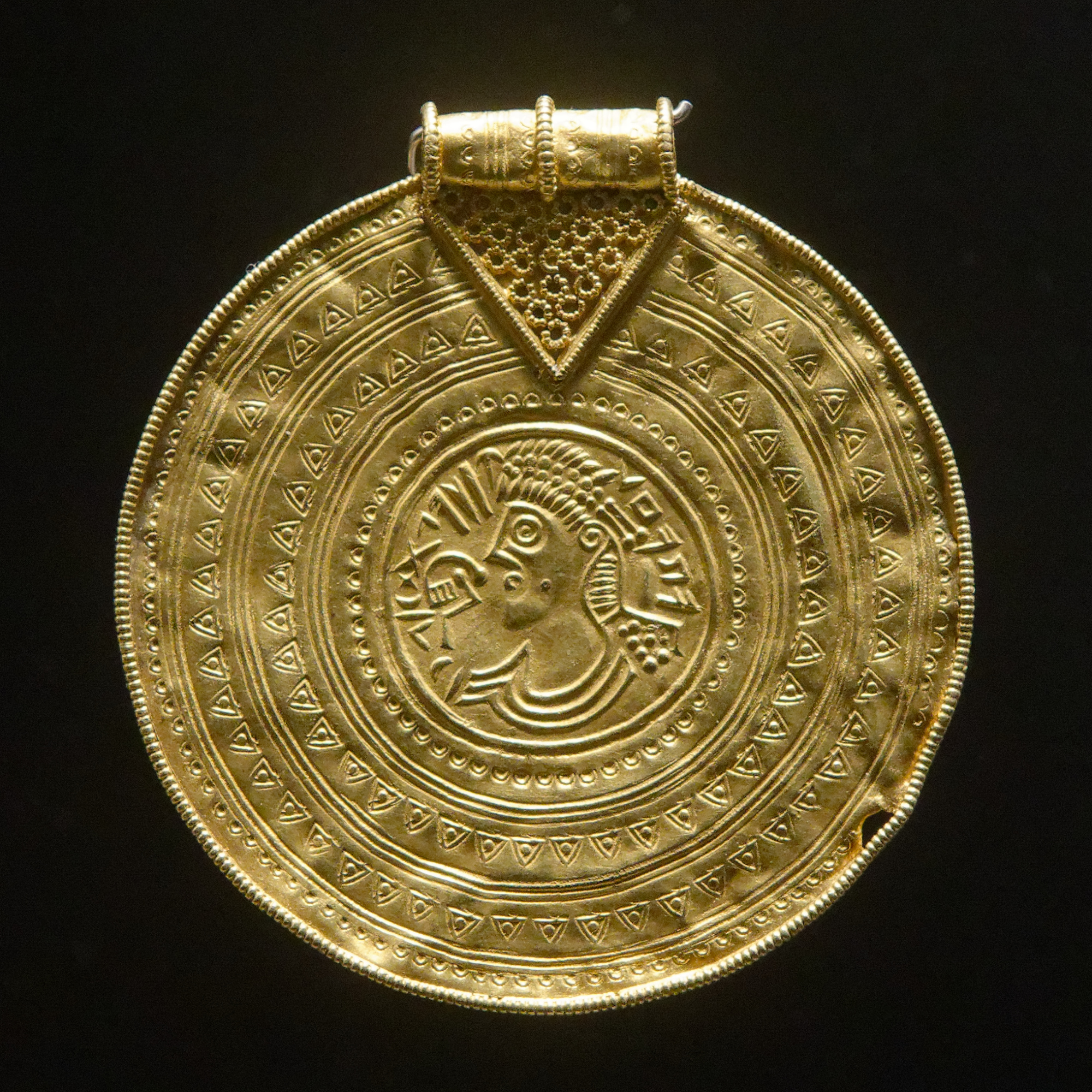
Gold bracteate from a hoard in Over Hornbæk, central Jutland, Denmark. From between circa 450 and circa 600 AD.

Tjurkö bracteate DR IK184

Gold bracteates commonly denote a certain type of jewelry, made mainly in the 5th to 7th century AD, represented by numerous gold specimens. Bead-rimmed and fitted with a loop, most were intended to be worn suspended by a string around the neck, supposedly as an amulet. The gold for the bracteates came from coins paid as peace money by the Roman Empire to their Northern Germanic neighbors.

=== Motifs ===
Many of the bracteates feature ruler portraits of Germanic kings with characteristic hair that is plaited back and depictions of figures from Germanic mythology influenced to varying extents by Roman coinage while others feature entirely new motifs. The motifs are commonly those of Germanic mythology and some are believed to be Germanic pagan icons giving protection or for divination.

Often depicted is a figure with a horse, birds and sometimes a spear – that some scholars interpret as a representation of the Germanic god Wodan – and aspects of the figure that would later appear in 13th century depictions as Odin such as the Poetic Edda. For this reason the bracteates are a target of iconographic studies by scholars interested in Germanic religion. Several bracteates also feature runic alphabet inscriptions (a total of 133 inscriptions on bracteates are known, amounting to more than a third of the entire Elder Futhark corpus). Numerous bracteates feature swastikas as a common motif.

=== Typology ===
The typology for bracteates divides them into several letter-named categories, a system introduced in an 1855 treatise by the Danish numismatist Christian Jürgensen Thomsen named Om Guldbracteaterne og Bracteaternes tidligste Brug som Mynt and finally defined formally by the Swedish numismatist Oscar Montelius in his 1869 treatise Från jernåldern:

- A-bracteates (~92 specimens): showing the face of a human, modelled after antique imperial coins
- B-bracteates (~91 specimens): one to three human figures in standing, sitting or kneeling positions, often accompanied by animals
- C-bracteates (best represented, by ~426 specimens): showing a male's head above a quadruped, often interpreted as the Germanic god Woden.
- D-bracteates (~359 specimens): showing one or more highly stylized animals
- E-bracteates (~280 specimens): showing an animal triskele under a circular feature
- F-bracteates (~17 specimens): as a subgroup of the D-bracteates, showing an imaginary animal
- M-'bracteates' (~17 specimens): two-sided imitations of Roman imperial medallions

=== Corpus ===
More than 1,000 Migration Period bracteates of type A-, B-, C-, D-, and F are known in total (Heizmann & Axboe 2011). Of these, 135 (ca. 11%) bear Elder Futhark inscriptions which are often very short; the most notable inscriptions are found on the Seeland-II-C (offering traveling protection to the one who wears it), Vadstena (giving a listing of the Elder Futhark combined with a potential magical inscription) and Tjurkö (featuring an inscription in scaldic verse) bracteates.

To these can be added the ca. 270 E-bracteates (Gaimster 1998), which belong to the Vendel Period and thus are slightly later than the other types. They were produced only on Gotland, and while the earlier bracteates (apart from a few English pieces) all were made from gold, many E-bracteates were made from silver or bronze.

The German historian Karl Hauck, Danish archaeologist Morten Axboe and German runologist Klaus Düwel have worked since the 1960s to create a complete corpus of the early Germanic bracteates from the migration period, complete with large scale photographs and drawings. This has been published in three volumes in German named Die Goldbrakteaten der Völkerwanderungszeit. Ikonographischer Katalog. A catalogue supplement is included in Heizmann & Axboe 2011.

== High medieval bracteates ==
Silver bracteates (in German Brakteat, also called "hollow pennies": Hohlpfennige or Schüsselpfennige) are different from the migration period bracteates. They were the predominant regional coinage type minted in German-speaking areas (with the exception of Rhineland, Westphalia and the Middle Rhine region) beginning at around 1130 in Saxony and Thuringia and lasted well into the 14th century. From a currency point of view, bracteates were a typical "regional penny" currency of the time.

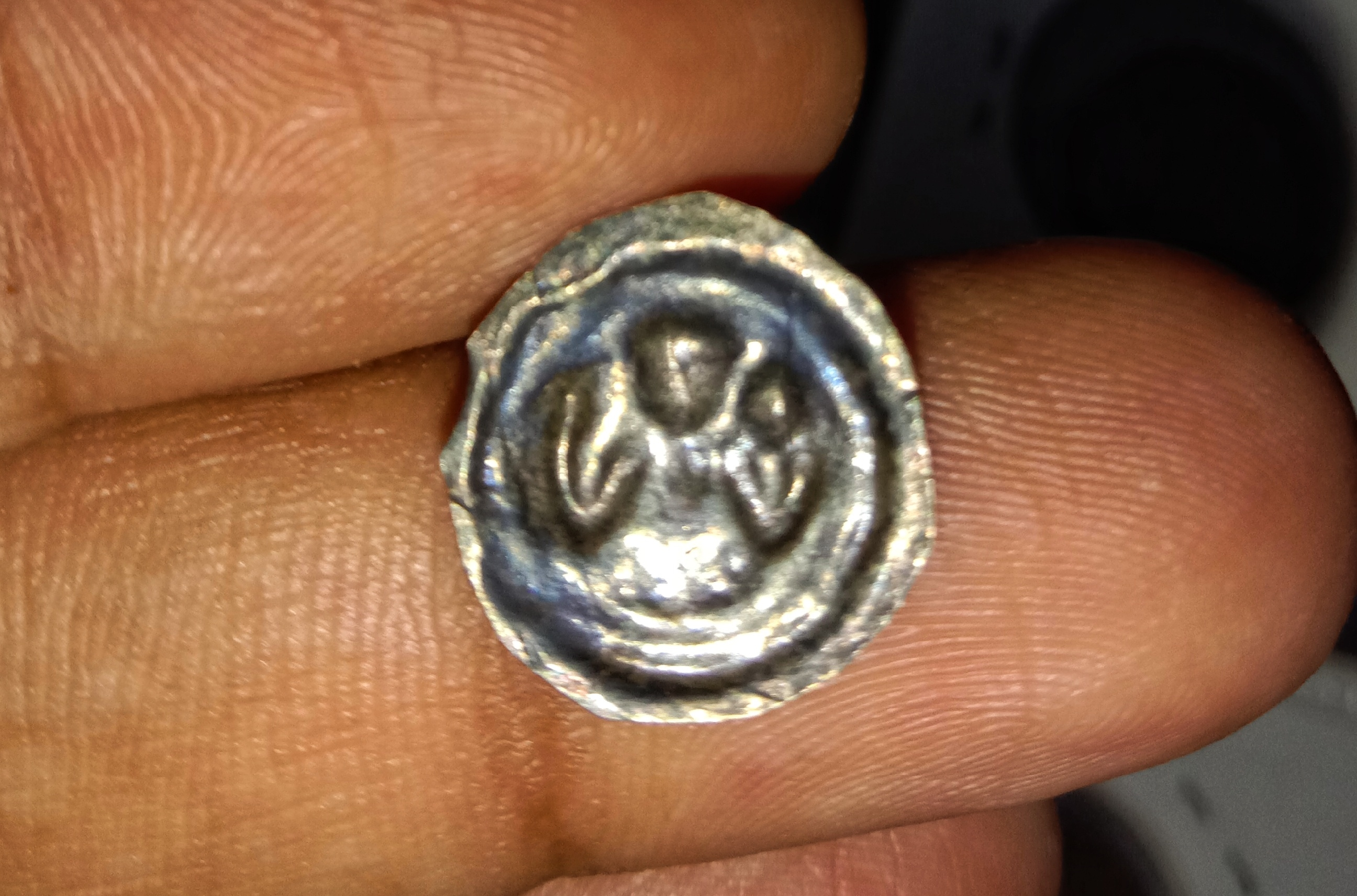
Reverse of a Medieval European Bracteate (coin) made out of silver

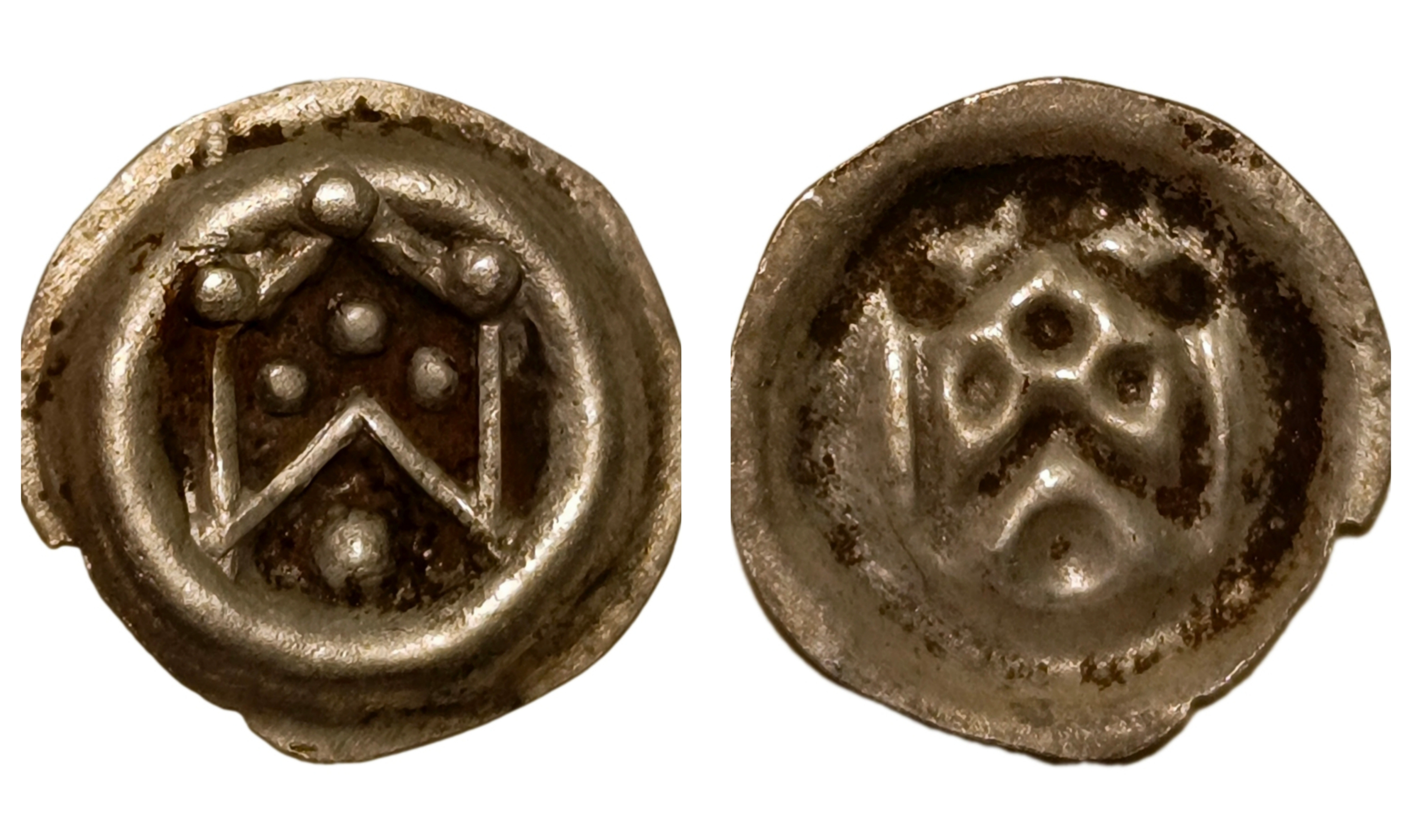
Bracteate of the Teutonic Order (13th-14th Century).

Medieval silver bracteates are one-sided, stamped pfennigs from thin silver sheet, with a diameter of 22 to 45 mm. The coin image appears in a high relief, while the back remains hollow. The large area left much room for artistic representations. Usual were three denominations, a two-pfennig (Blaffert) with elaborate image, a one-pfennig (Hohlpfennig) with coarse image and hollow coins worth half a pfennig (Scherf).

The bracteates were usually called back regularly, about once or twice a year, and had to be exchanged for new coins (Renovatio Monetae). For example, receiving three new coins for four old coins. The withheld 4th coin was called strike money and was often the only tax revenue of the coin mint-master. This system worked like a demurrage currency: People were discouraged from hoarding their coins, because they lost their value. So, this money was used more as a medium of exchange than for storing value. This increased the velocity of money and stimulated the economy.

This disruption disturbed the business interests of all those who were involved in the then money economy, namely the merchants who dominated in the German city leagues. The city leagues then introduced from 1413 a so-called Ewiger Pfennig ("eternal penny").

The last bracteates were "traveller bracteates", embossed medallions worn as a pendant, that served as a type of presence mark for pilgrims and were in use until the 17th century.

In some cantons of Switzerland, bracteate-like rappen, heller, and angster were produced during the 18th century.

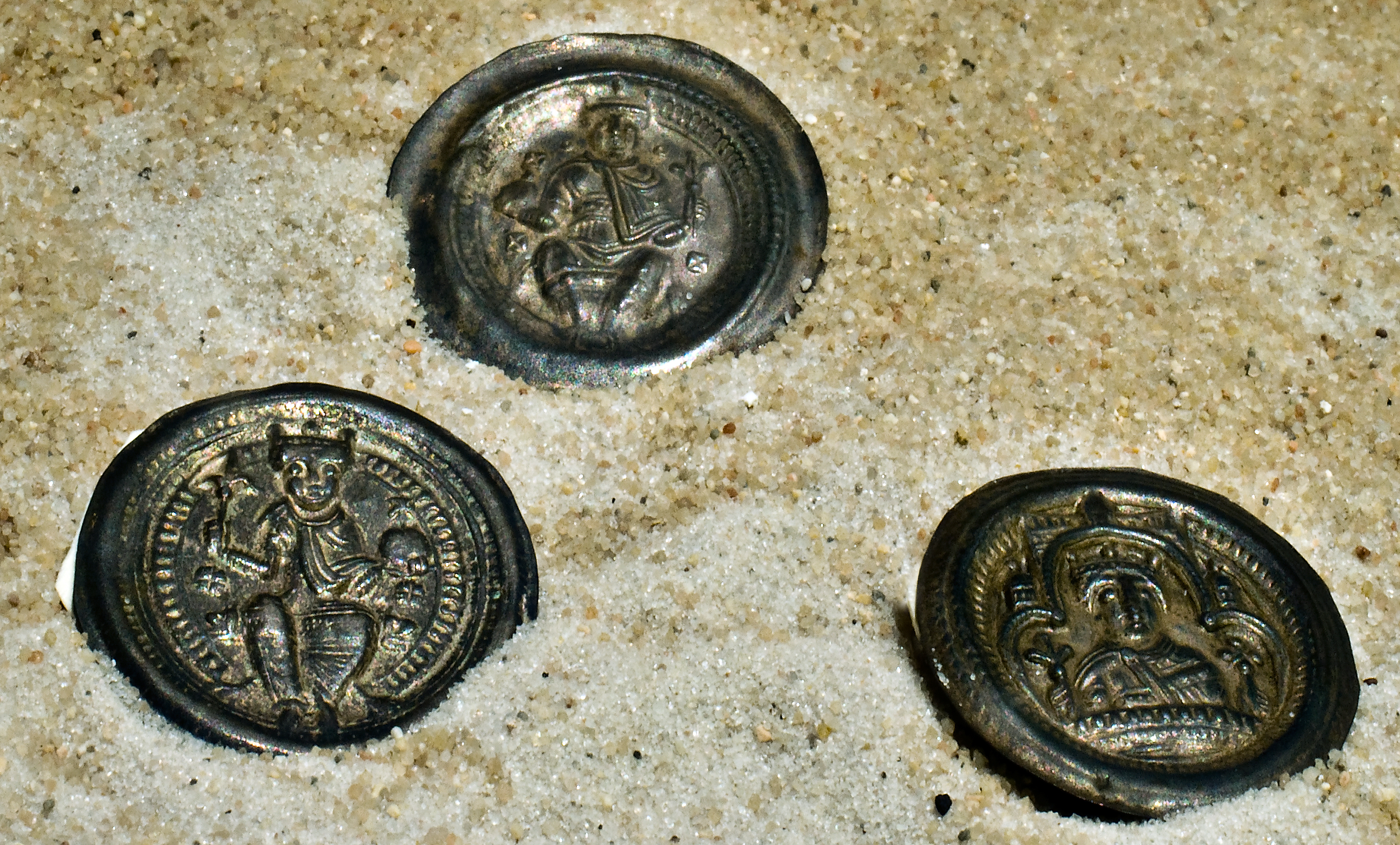
Medieval silver bracteates (hollow pennies), with depictions of Frederick I, Holy Roman Emperor, 12th century, Frankfurt am Main

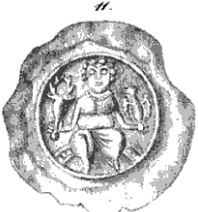
Medieval silver bracteate minted by the Burgraves of Dohna; the earliest minted from c. 1200

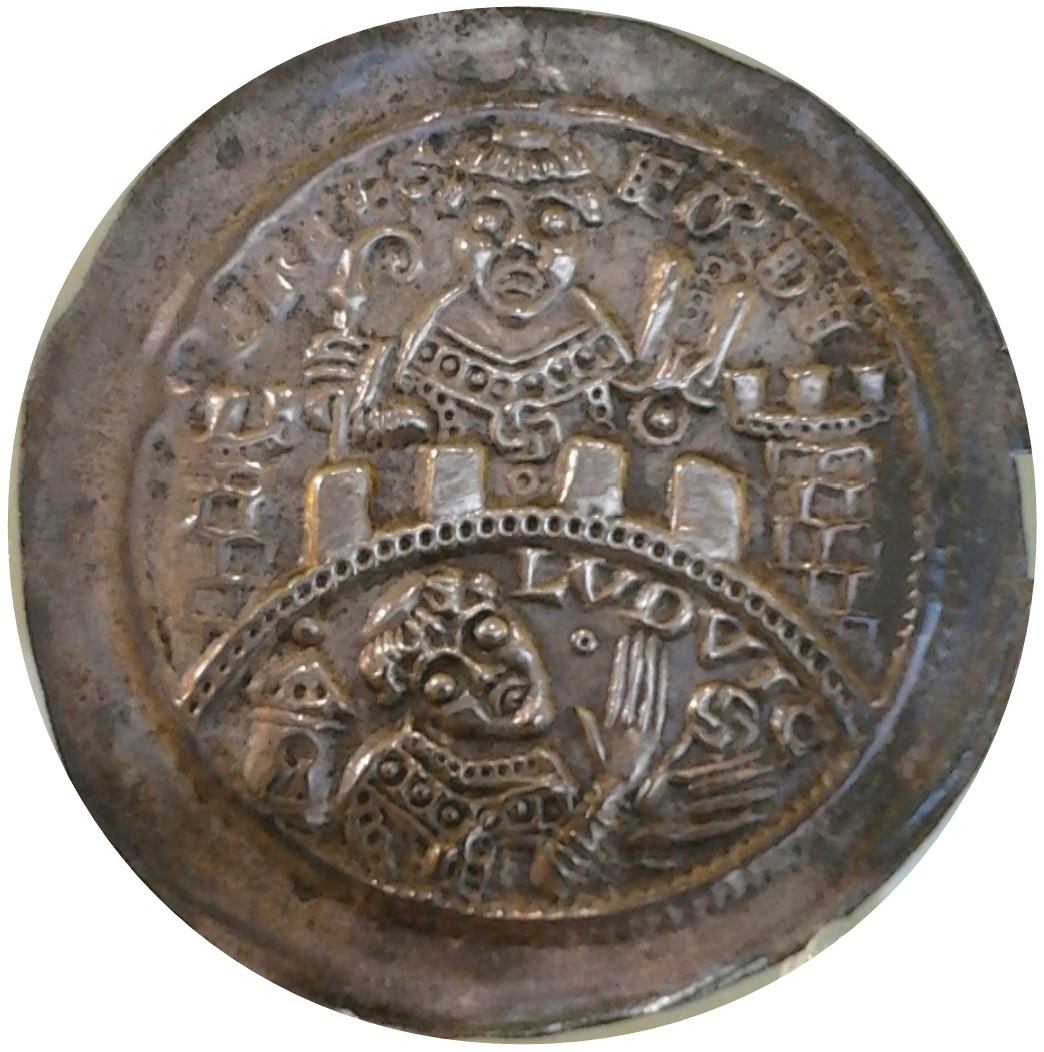
Bracteate of Louis II, Landgrave of Thuringia

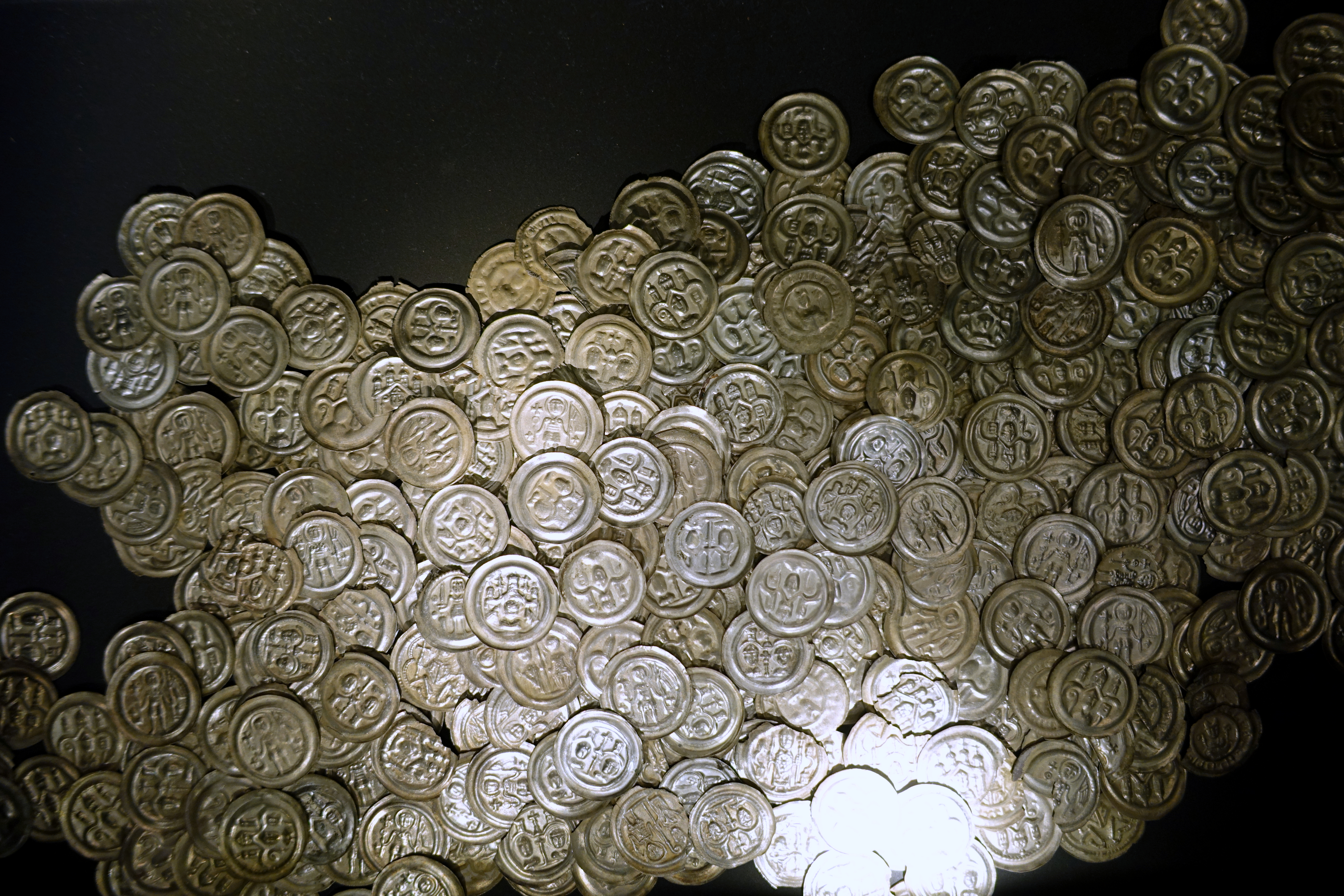
Hoard of 600 Magdeburg bracteates from the early 13th century (Bode Museum)
