= Weckeler =

14th and 15th century silver coin

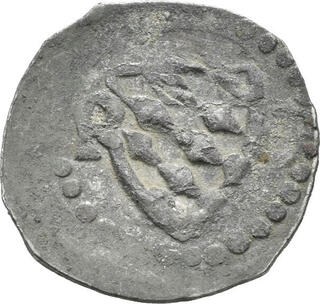
Palatine Weckeler (Schüsselpfennig)

The Weckeler, also called a Weckelerpfennig, is a one-sided silver Palatine pfennig coin of the 14th and 15th century, which was also called the Wegkpfennig in the local dialect. It occurs both as a Schüsselpfennig and as a non-domed, planar coin. The pfennigs were given their contemporary name after their image, a lozenged coat of arms.

This pfennig, with its ring of pearls around a central lozenged shield or just a lozenge without a shield, developed into the bowl-shaped Schüsselpfennig in the 15th century. The Weckeler was struck on one side only using a coin die smaller than the actual planchet. The force of the die stamp caused the perimeter of the planchet to curve upwards to a greater or lesser extent.

== Literature ==
- Helmut Kahnt: Das große Münzlexikon von A bis Z., Regenstauf 2005
- Heinz Fengler, Gerd Gierow, Willy Unger: transpress Lexikon Numismatik, Berlin 1976
- Friedrich von Schrötter (ed.), with N. Bauer, K. Regling, A. Suhle, R. Vasmer, J. Wilcke (1970) [reprint of the original 1930 edn.] Wörterbuch der Münzkunde, Berlin: de Gruyter.
