= Diocese of Constance =

Former Roman Catholic diocese in Konstanz, Germany

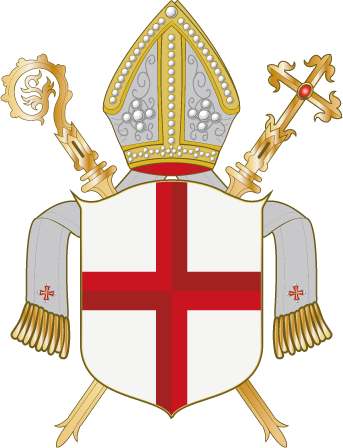
Coat of arms of the Diocese of Konstanz

The Diocese of Constance (Latin: Dioecesis Constantinensis) was a diocese of the Roman Catholic Church based in Konstanz on Lake Constance, under the patronage of Saints Pelagius and Conrad of Constance. It existed from approximately 585 until its dissolution in 1821. The German territories were incorporated into the newly established Archdiocese of Freiburg and Diocese of Rottenburg, while the Swiss territories were assigned to the Diocese of Chur and Diocese of Basel for administration.

The diocese was part of the so-called Pfaffengasse and a core region of the Duchy of Swabia.

== Diocesan territory ==
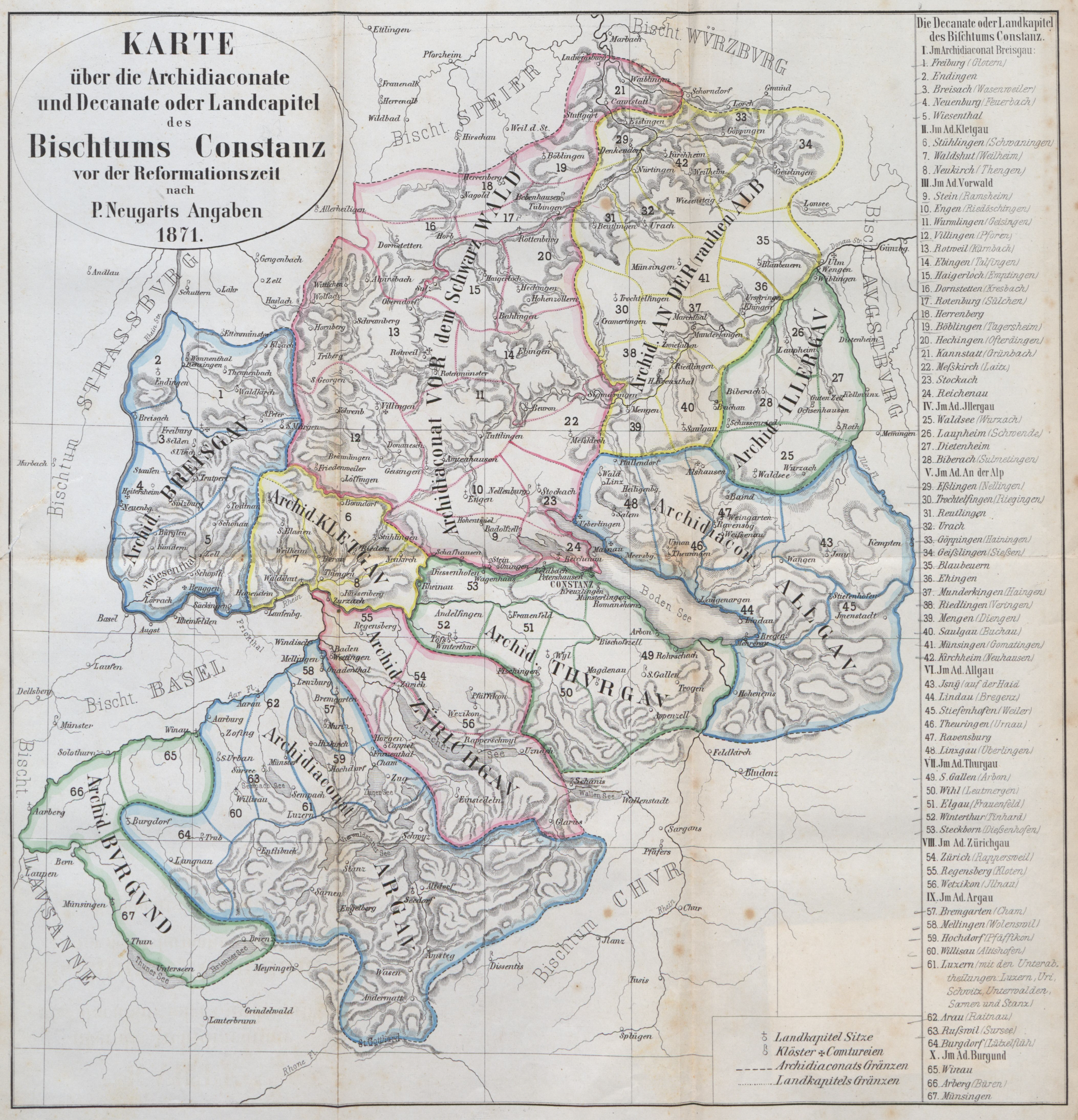
Map of the archdeaconries and deaneries of the Diocese of Constance before the Reformation

By the end of the Salian period in the 12th century, the Holy Roman Empire comprised 42 dioceses across six ecclesiastical provinces. German dioceses, averaging 13,000 km^{2}, were significantly larger than others. In the 12th century, the largest dioceses were Prague (52,000 km^{2}), Salzburg (40,000 km^{2}), and Constance (36,000 km^{2}).

At its peak in the 15th century (early modern period), the Diocese of Constance was definitively the largest German diocese, surpassed only by Passau in the Middle Ages. Covering approximately 45,000 km^{2}, it was larger than modern Switzerland (41,300 km^{2}) or Baden-Württemberg (35,750 km^{2}). While Passau and Constance were similar in area, Constance had roughly twice as many parishes, clergy, and "souls to be tended." In 1249, Passau had about 920 parishes; by 1439, Constance had over 1,700.

The Constance diocesan territory, part of the ecclesiastical province of Mainz, extended from the Gotthard Massif to the upper Danube, the upper and middle Neckar, from the Rhine to the Iller, and included the Breisgau and Bregenz Forest, as well as areas of northern, central, and eastern Switzerland east of the Aare. From 1275, the diocese was divided into 64 deaneries and ten archdeaconries: Black Forest, Swabian Jura, Allgäu, Illergau, Burgundy, Klettgau, Breisgau, Thurgau, Zürichgau, and Aargau. The so-called "Swiss Quarter" included much of modern Switzerland, such as most of the Canton of Aargau, areas of the cantons of Bern and Solothurn east of the Aare, the cantons of Uri, Schwyz, Obwalden, Nidwalden, and nearly all of Lucerne, Zug, Glarus, Zürich, Schaffhausen, Thurgau, St. Gallen, and both Appenzell cantons. Only the right-bank part of Basel city belonged to the diocese.

Adjacent dioceses included Speyer and Würzburg to the north, Augsburg to the east, Chur to the southeast, Milan to the south, Lausanne and Basel to the west, and Strasbourg to the northwest.

== History ==
=== Early missionaries at Lake Constance ===
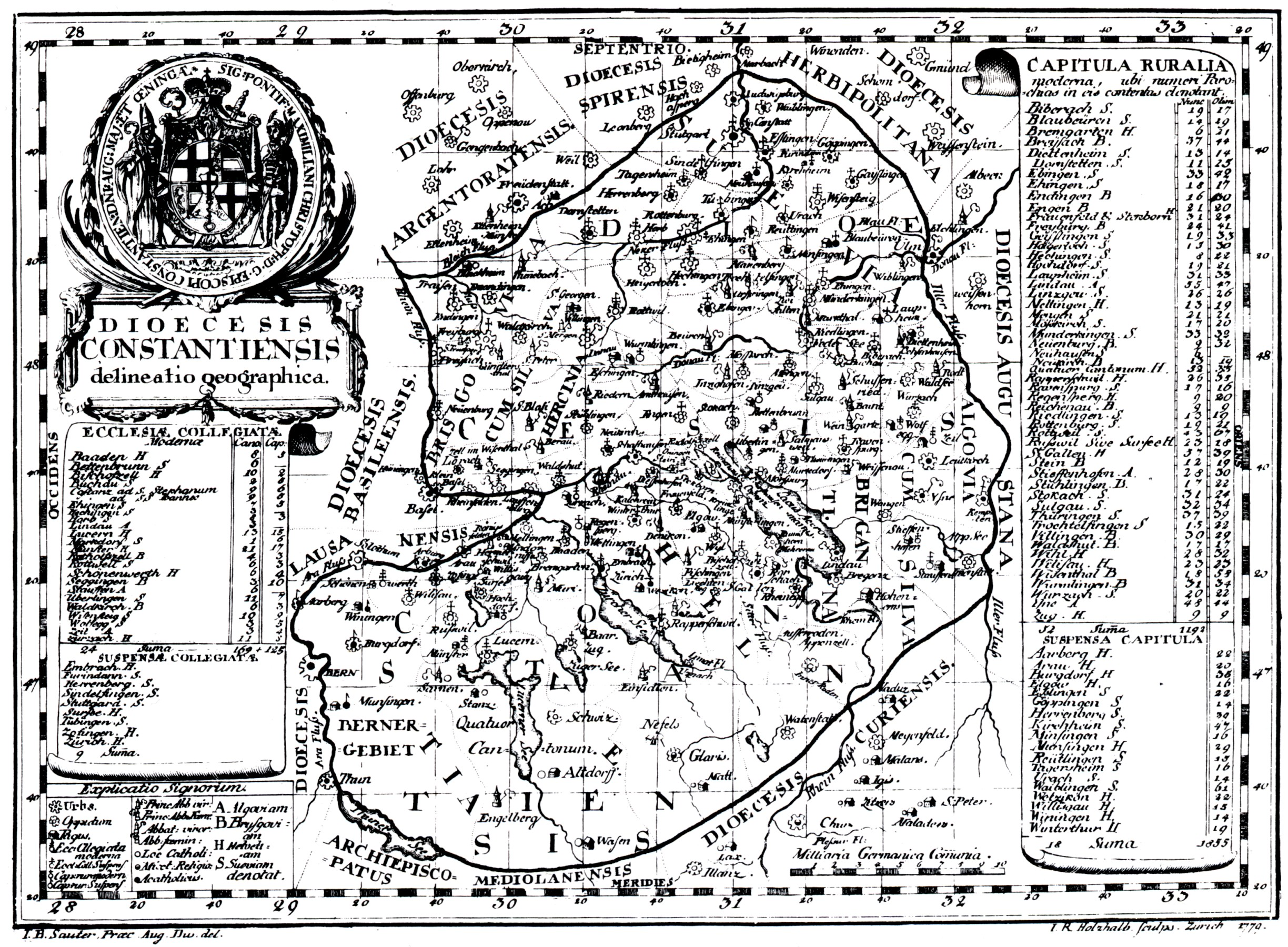
Detailed diocesan map from 1779

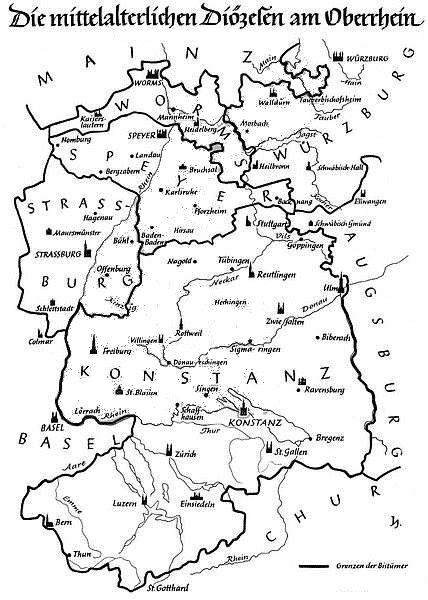
Diocese of Constance in the Middle Ages

As early as the 6th century, missionaries such as Fridolin, Landelin, Trudpert, and Gallus arrived among the Alamanni at the Rhine and Lake Constance. Säckingen on the Upper Rhine and Schuttern in the Ortenau were among the earliest monastic foundations. The abbey on Reichenau Island was founded around 724 by the itinerant bishop Pirmin. Other monasteries, which became centers of Christian life through their schools, were established in Gengenbach, Schwarzach, Mosbach, and Ettenheimmünster.

In the 7th and 8th centuries, Christianity spread to the Main Franconian regions. Saints Kilian and Boniface with their companions laid the groundwork for the Church. The Benedictine convent in Tauberbischofsheim, led by Saint Lioba as abbess from around 750, gained significant influence.

=== Alemannic diocese ===
To missionize the Alamanni, the Diocese of Constance was likely established around 585, with the episcopal see transferred from Vindonissa (Windisch) to Constance. Until 780/782, it belonged to the ecclesiastical province of Besançon, then to the Archdiocese of Mainz.

The Badische Historische Kommission noted that "in the first centuries of Alemannic Christianization," the episcopate—referring to Constance —"rarely stood out; let alone played a leading role. […] The earliest monastic foundations occurred independently of the responsible bishop." Biographers of Saint Gallus later deemed it necessary to address this emancipation from episcopal jurisdiction, and "Pirmin carried out his reform work across various dioceses without bishoply involvement." Only in the late 8th century, under Bishop Johannes II (previously abbot of St. Gallen), did Constance bishops bring the powerful nearby monasteries of Reichenau and St. Gallen under their control. Under the Carolingians, these monasteries later regained immunity, free abbot elections, and exemption from tithes.

Among the most prominent early medieval bishops was the "Alemannic bishop" Conrad of Constance (934–975), closely connected to Emperor Otto I, who visited the diocese for the Pelagius feast in August 972 after returning from Italy.

A bishop's church is first mentioned in the 7th century. Construction of the Minster of Our Lady began in 1054 after the Ottonian predecessor collapsed.

In the 11th century, the Cluny Abbey in Burgundy became the epicenter of the radical reform of monastic life. The Cluniac movement spread from Hirsau Abbey into southwest Germany, leading to the founding of St. Peter in the Black Forest, which housed the seminary of the Archdiocese of Freiburg until 2006. Today, the former monastic buildings host the spiritual center of the Archdiocese of Freiburg. The subsequent, more radical Cistercian reform in the 12th century led to the establishment of influential monasteries like Salem Abbey, Tennenbach Abbey, and Lichtenthal Abbey.

=== Council of Constance ===
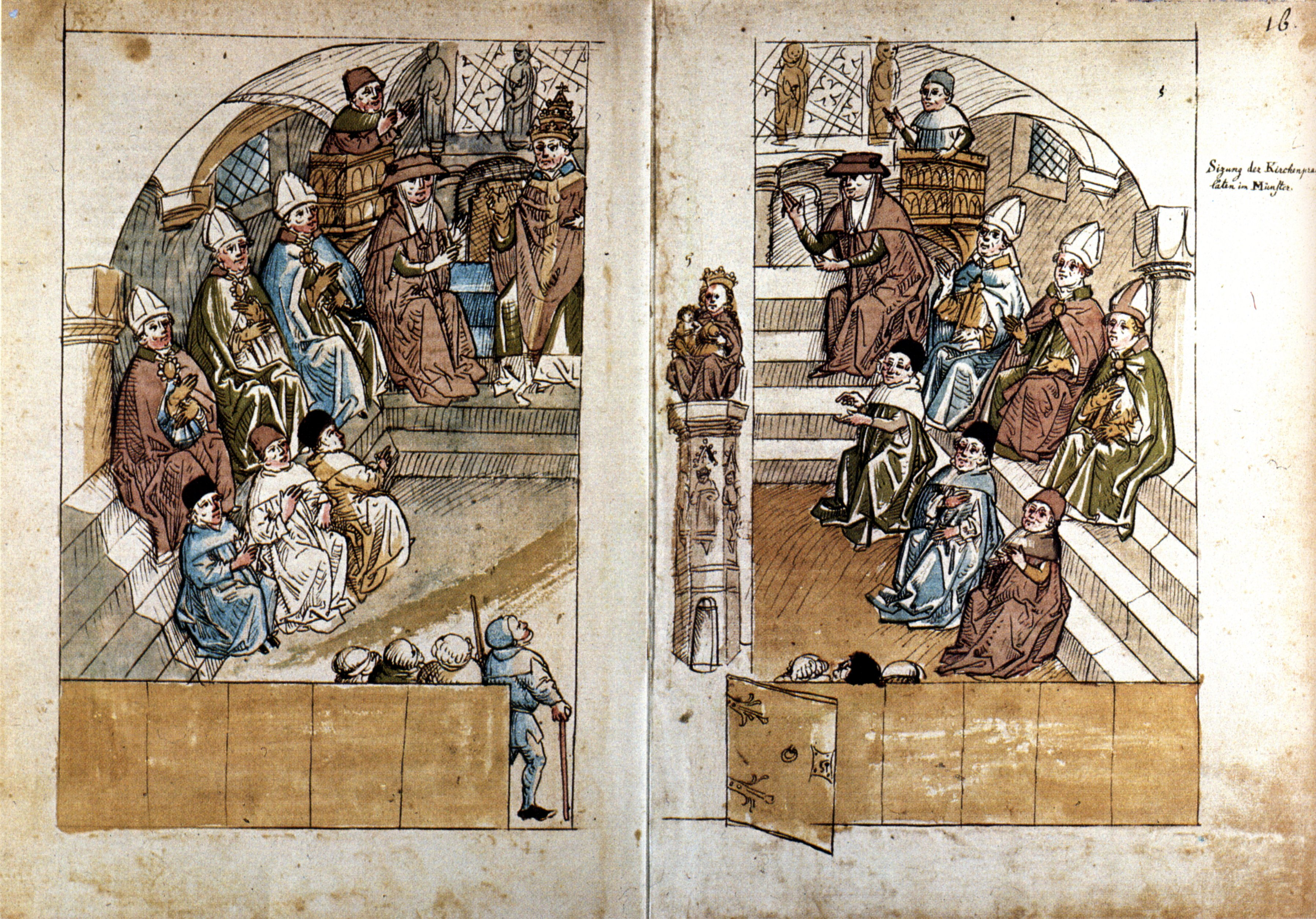
Council session in Constance Minster (from the chronicle of the Council of Constance by Ulrich von Richental)

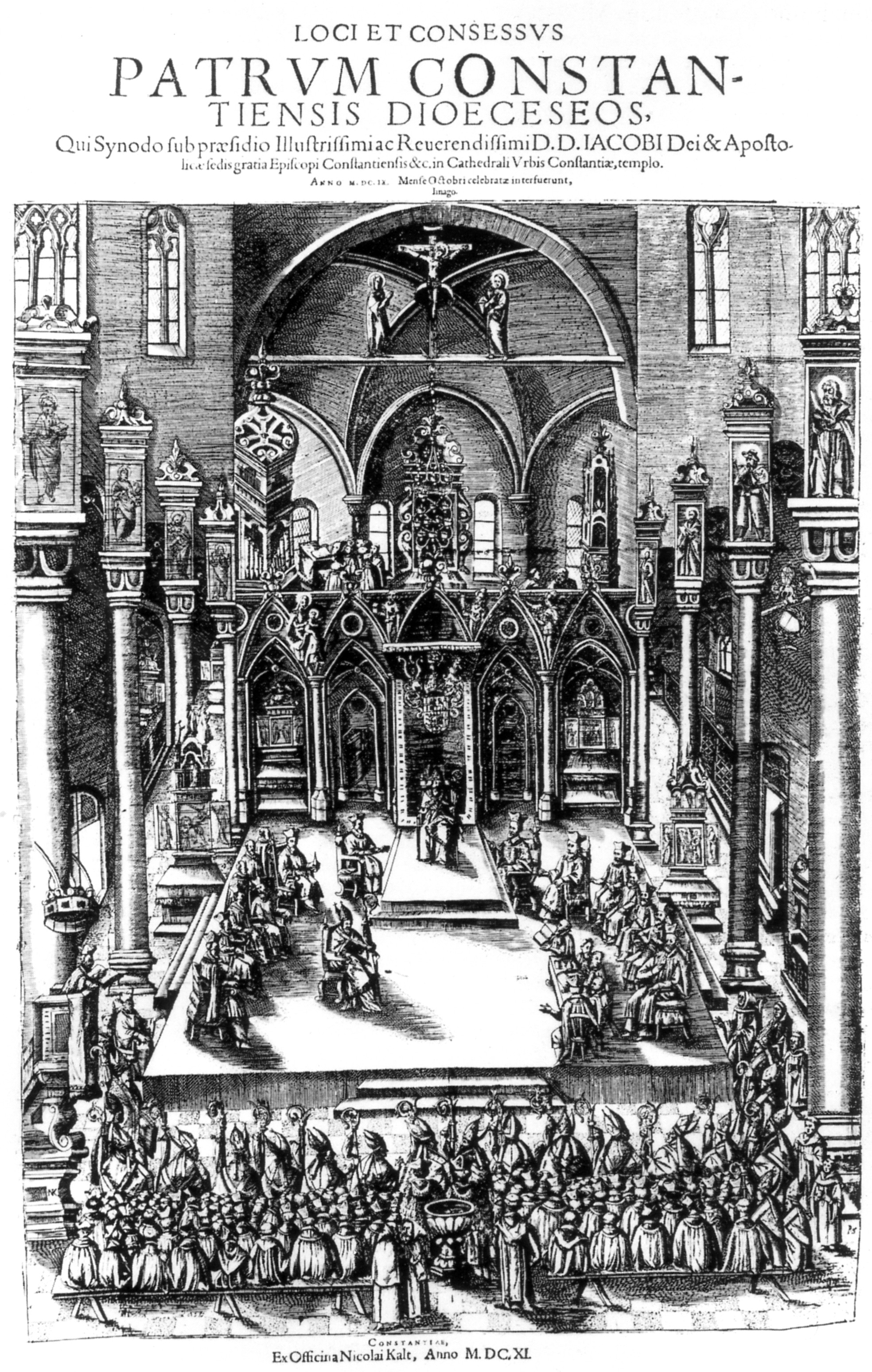
Diocesan synod in the Minster (1609)

In the early 15th century, Constance, then a bishop's city, became the center of ecclesiastical and political events during the Council of Constance (1414–1418). Convened by Emperor Sigismund to resolve the disputed papal succession after the popes' return from Avignon, it elected Cardinal Colonna as Pope Martin V. The bishops were secular lords of the Prince-Bishopric of Constance.

=== Reformation and Counter-Reformation ===
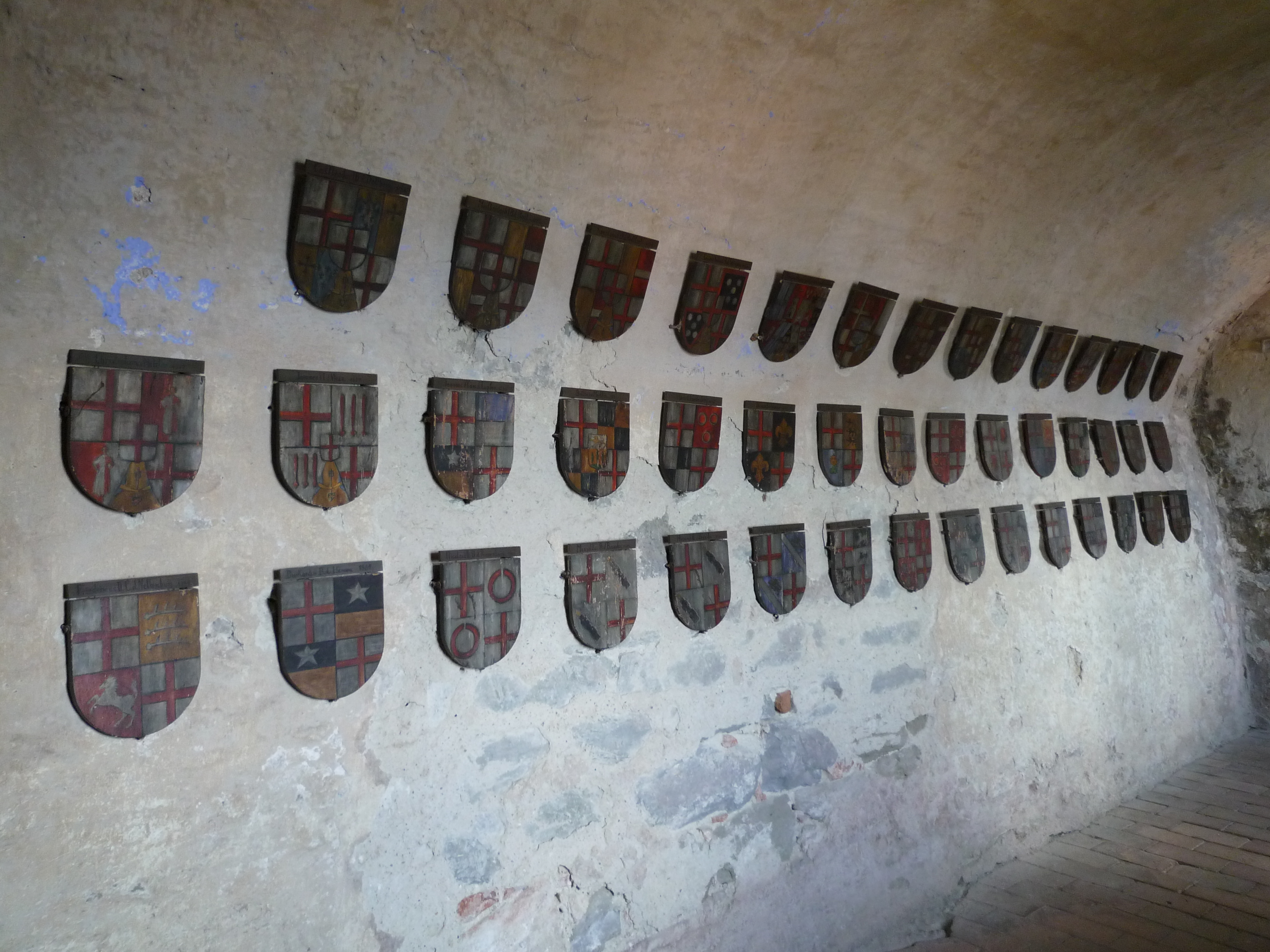
Coat of arms of the Constance bishops in the Hohenstaufen corridor of Meersburg Castle

The Reformation, initiated by Martin Luther in the early 16th century, spread rapidly in southwest Germany. The Margrave of Baden-Durlach and the Elector of the Palatinate in Heidelberg were key rulers who introduced the Reformation. Constance adopted the Reformation in 1527, prompting the bishop to flee to Meersburg.

Constance did not remain Protestant for long: in 1548, it lost its imperial city status, was incorporated into Further Austria, and recatholicized. The bishop officially returned to Constance, but the residence remained in Meersburg until the diocese's end. Around 1600, the Jesuits, invited to Constance, significantly strengthened the Catholic faith.

=== Secularization and dissolution ===
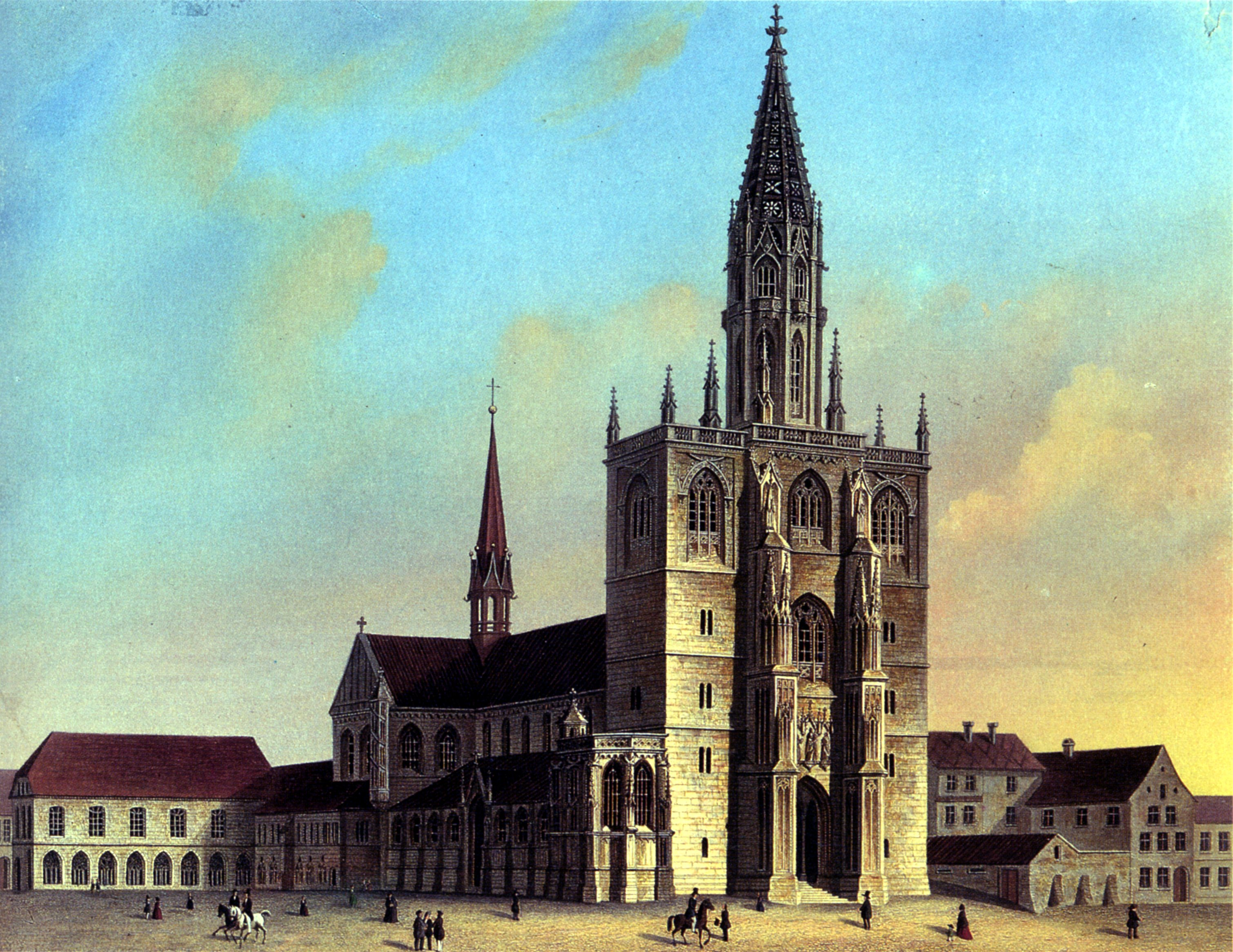
The Konstanz Minster, cathedral church of the Diocese of Konstanz for about 800 years

The rationalist intellectual movement of the late 18th century and the enlightened absolutism promoted by Emperor Joseph II influenced southwest Germany through Freiburg im Breisgau, part of Further Austria. The Coalition Wars and the secularization of 1803 brought profound changes. The Prince-Bishopric of Constance was transferred to the Margraviate of Baden under § 5 of the Reichsdeputationshauptschluss (ratified April 27, 1803); the Margrave had provisionally taken possession via a patent on September 16, 1802.

The ecclesiastical jurisdiction initially remained unaffected (§ 62). However, in Württemberg and Baden, governments' efforts to establish a "state-controlled church" over the Catholic Church (via "Catholic departments" in culture ministries) limited the diocese's authority, particularly in Württemberg, where the bishop's powers were confined to those tied to consecration.

In Constance, vicar general Ignaz Heinrich von Wessenberg operated under Bishop Karl Theodor von Dalberg in the spirit of Josephinism. After Dalberg's death, the cathedral chapter elected Wessenberg as successor in 1817, but Pope Pius VII did not recognize the election. The bull Provida solersque of August 16, 1821, declared the Diocese of Constance dissolved, merging it into the new Archdiocese of Freiburg and Rottenburg (now Rottenburg-Stuttgart). Swiss territories were initially administered provisionally by Franz Bernhard Göldlin von Tiefenau from Beromünster and assigned to the Diocese of Basel and Diocese of Chur. Wessenberg, protected by Baden's rulers, continued his role until 1827, establishing a general vicariate in Bruchsal. The successor dioceses of Freiburg and Rottenburg were only appointed in 1828 after prolonged political negotiations between Baden and the Vatican.

The abrupt dissolution of the largest Catholic diocese north of the Alps, aimed at removing Wessenberg, is evident in the fact that the Swiss cantons of Glarus, Obwalden, Nidwalden, Uri, and Zürich remain provisionally administered by the Bishop of Chur as former Constance territories. The Canton of Thurgau was assigned to the Diocese of Basel, while St. Gallen formed the Diocese of St. Gallen since 1823/47, with both Appenzell cantons under its apostolic administration.

At its end, the diocese was notably enlightened and liberal; fifty years after its dissolution, resistance to the First Vatican Council persisted. The core region of the Old Catholic and Christian Catholic churches in Germany and Switzerland lies in the former Diocese of Constance. Many hymns and traditions in the modern Catholic dioceses of Freiburg, Rottenburg-Stuttgart, Chur, and St. Gallen originate from the diocese's heyday under Dalberg and Wessenberg.

== See also ==
- Heinrich Murer: Chronik des Bistums Constance, Thurgau Cantonal Library Y 106 Digital copy.
- Constance Minster, former cathedral church
- Introduction of the Ewiger Pfennig – Hohlpfennig of the Diocese of Constance

== Bibliography ==
- Göpfert, Dieter (2005). Das Bistum Konstanz – um 600 bis 1821 – Geschichte und Bedeutung. Markdorf: Druckerei Ernst Knoblauch.
- Elmar L. Kuhn, Eva Moser, Rudolf Reinhardt, Petra Sachs: Die Bischöfe von Konstanz. 2 volumes. Gessler, Friedrichshafen 1988, ISBN 3-922137-48-2.
- Helmut Maurer (historian) (2003). Die Bischöfe vom Ende des 6. Jahrhunderts bis 1206. Germania Sacra. Die Bistümer der Kirchenprovinz Mainz. Vol. 5. Berlin: De Gruyter. ISBN 3-11-017664-5. "Incorrectly listed as volume 2 in the book."
- Elisabeth Reiners-Ernst: Die Gründung des Bistums Konstanz in neuer Sicht. In: Schriften des Vereins für Geschichte des Bodensees und seiner Umgebung. 71st year, 1952, pp. 17–36 (Digital copy)
