= Heller (coin) =

European coin

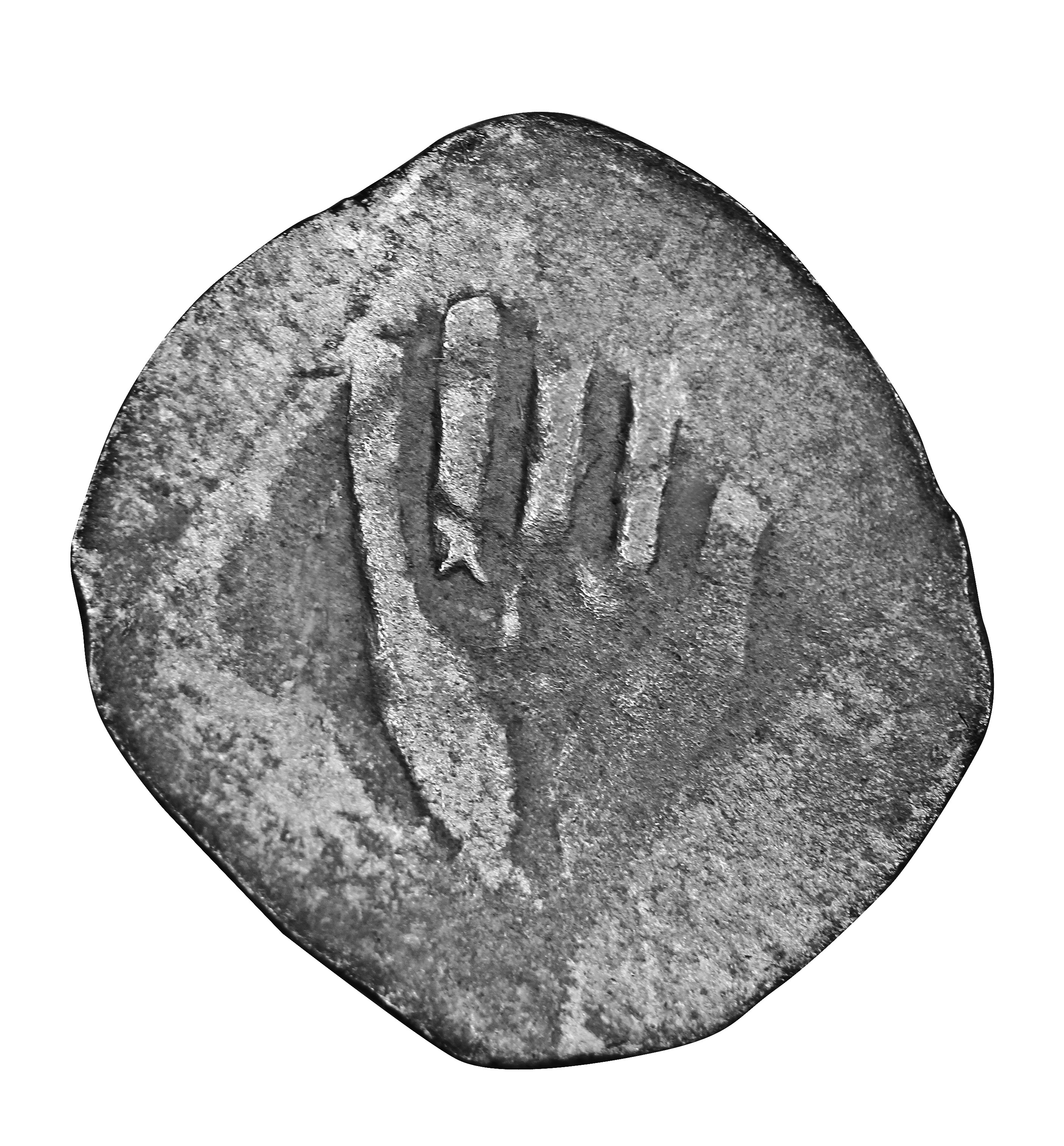
Silver trading heller (Händelheller), Hall am Kocher, 13th century

The Heller, abbreviation hlr or h, was a coin, originally valued at half a pfennig, that was issued in Switzerland and various states of the Holy Roman Empire, surviving in some European countries until the 20th century.

It was first recorded in 1200 or 1208 though according to Reiner Hausherr, it may have existed as early as 1189. The hellers were gradually so debased that they were no longer silver coins. There were 576 hellers in a Reichsthaler ("imperial thaler"). After the Second World War, hellers only survived in Czechoslovakia and Hungary.

The heller also existed as a silver unit of weight equal to 1/512 of a Mark.

During the interwar period, Notgeld (emergency paper money) was issued in Germany, Austria, and Liechtenstein and was denominated in hellers.

== Name ==
The Heller, also called the Haller or Häller (German: [ˈhɛlɐ]), in Latin sources: denarius hallensis or hallensis denarius, derives its name from the city of Hall am Kocher (today Schwäbisch Hall). Silver coins stamped on both sides (Häller Pfennige) were called Händelheller, often depicted a hand. A distinction was made between white, red, and black hellers.

== Germany ==
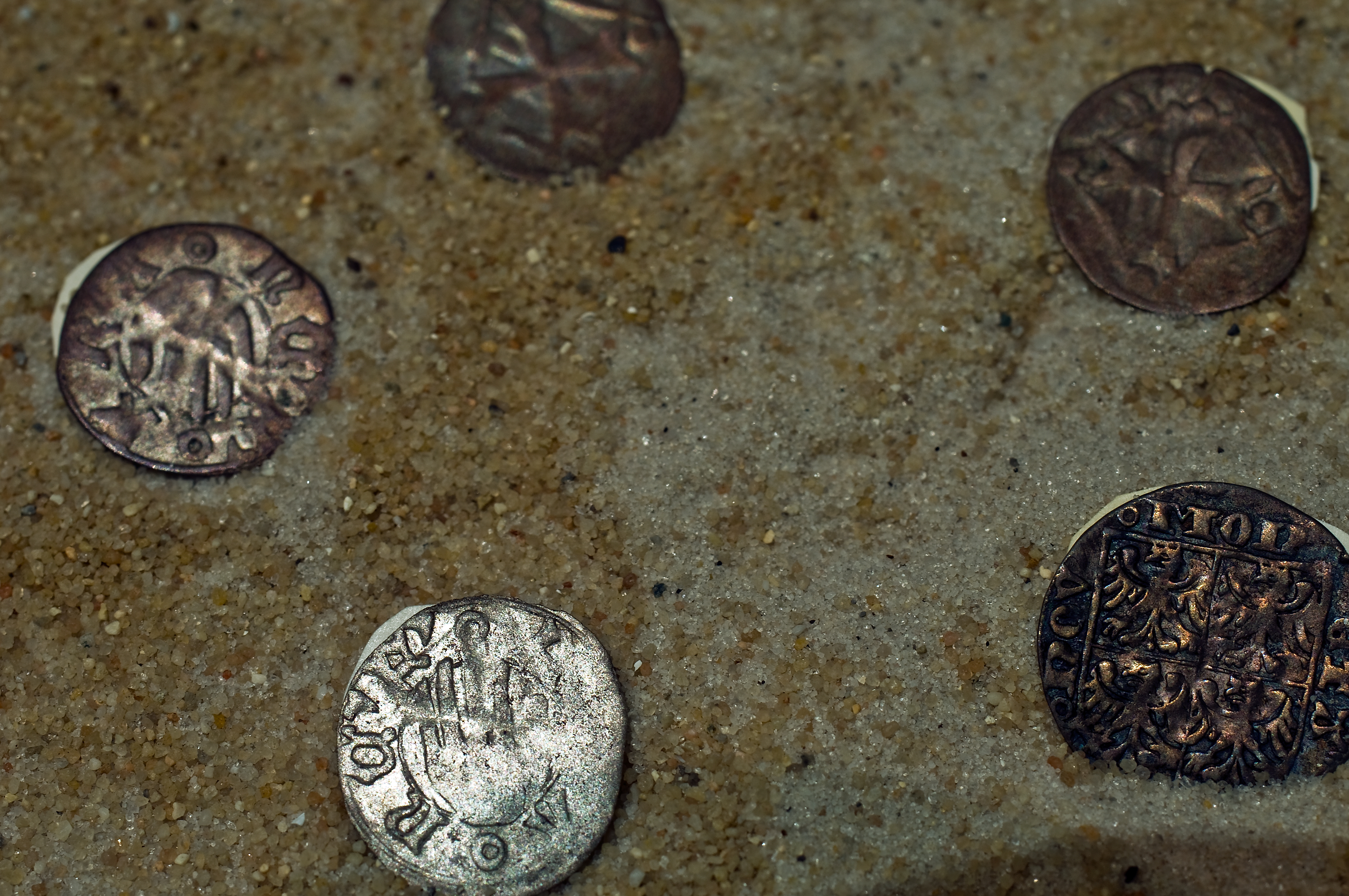
Heller, Frankfurt, from 1428

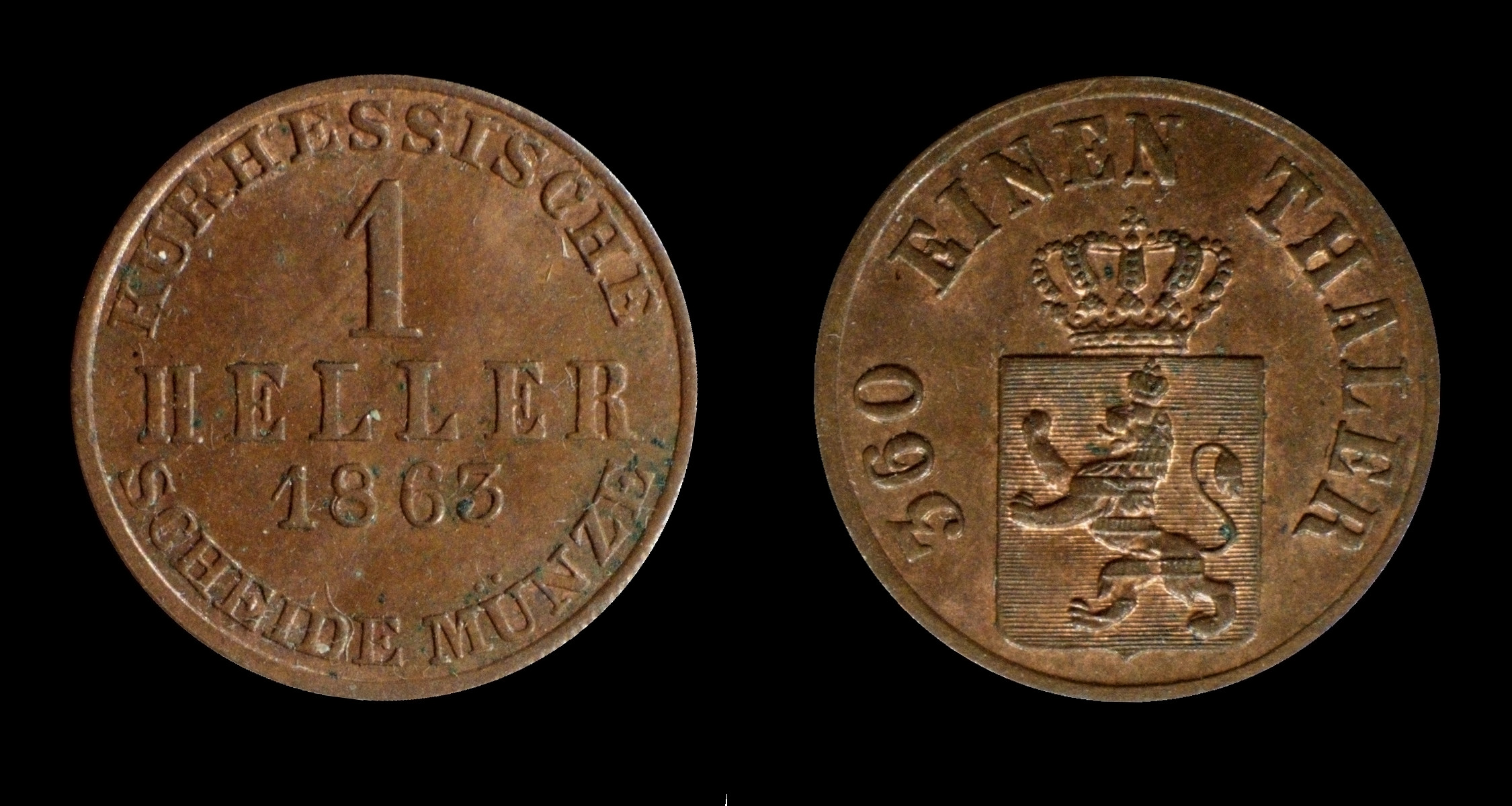
Hellers, Electorate of Hesse, 1863

=== Overview ===
Mints began producing the coin in the early 13th century, based on a previously produced silver pfennig (Häller Pfennig, sometimes called Händelheller for its depiction of a hand on the front face). However, the composition deteriorated over time due to the gradual mixing in copper, which led to them no longer being considered as silver coins. There were red, white, and black Hellers. Beginning in the Middle Ages, it became a symbol of low worth, and a common German byword is "keinen (roten) Heller wert," lit.: not worth a (red) Heller, or "not worth a red cent."

The term Heller became widely used as a name for coins of small value throughout many of the German until 1873. After German unification, Bismarck's administration introduced the Mark and the pfennig as coinage throughout the German Empire.

=== History ===
In Swabia, the Heller originally corresponded to the Pfennig, totaling 240 Heller in a Carolingian pound. However, an imperial edict of 1385 halved the value of the Heller, resulting that 8 Hellers = 4 Pfennigs = 1 Kreuzer and 4 Kreuzer = 1 Batzen

Due to the low value and the non-standard quality of these coins, it was common in the High and Late Middle Ages to weigh large amounts of Hellers and to transact business based on the total coin weight; this often resulted in purchase amounts in "pound hellers," which did not necessarily correspond to the Carolingian pound of 240 hellers.

In what was then Bohemian Upper Lusatia, the cities Bautzen and Görlitz had the right to mint coins. In the 15th century they coined alternately every year. The Görlitz Heller (Katterfinken) was a coin whose silver content decreased more and more in later years.

For example, around 1490, the House of Wettin's silver pfennig currency was: 24 hellers = 12 pfennigs = 2 half Schwertpfennigs = 1 Spitzpfennig = 1 Bartpfennig or Zinspfennig. The hellers were hollow and called Hohlhellers, similar to the Thuringian Hohlpfennigs.

In Electoral Saxony, low-value Besselpfennigs circulated as "invaders." From 1668, they were referred to as Näpfchenheller in Saxon documents. In some areas of Saxony, such as the Ore Mountains, they became a nuisance as people preferred to throw the lower value Näpfchenhellers into the collection bag, significantly reducing income from the collection. This led, for example, in Annaberg to the introduction of special church pfennigs (Kirchenpfennige).

In the Electorate of Hesse, the silver groschen was divided into 12 hellers, making the heller equivalent to the Prussian pfennig. Dreiheller were copper 1 1/2 pfennig pieces that were minted in Saxe-Gotha.

With the transition to a standard imperial currency of marks and pfennigs under the Coinage Act of 9 July 1873, the heller, like many other old currency units, disappeared (except for the simple Vereinstaler, which circulated until 1907). Only the last Bavarian Heller of the former guilder standard remained valid in Bavaria for some time after 1878 as 1/2 pf coins of the new Goldmark imperial currency.

=== German East Africa ===
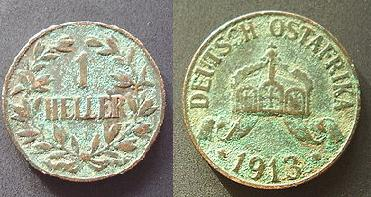
A heller from German East-Africa

The German heller was resurrected in 1904 when the government took over the currency of German East Africa from the German East Africa Company. The heller was introduced as 1/100 of a rupie, replacing the pesa, which had previously been valued as 1/64 of a rupie.

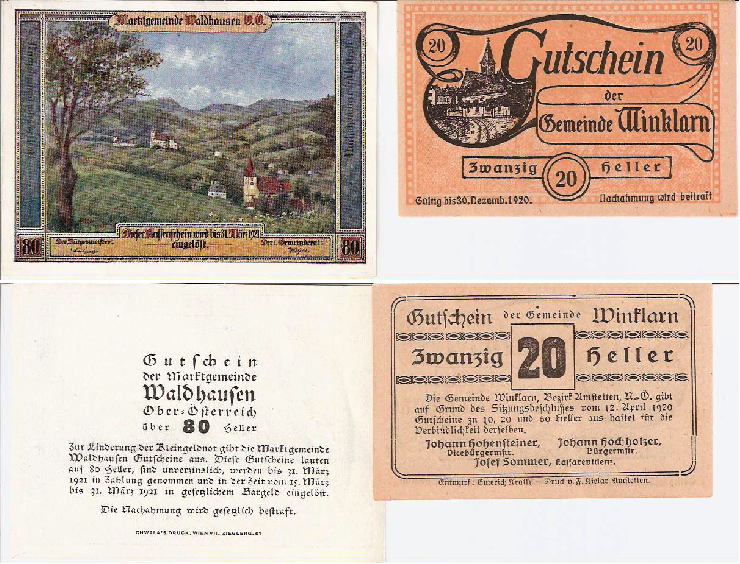
Bills of 80 and 20 Hellers from 1920 and 1921

In the 1920s, the Heller currency expanded to include greater denominations in the German territories, and printed bills were produced to represent their value for trade. Coins with values of 1/2, 1, 5, 10 and 20 hellers were minted.

== Austria-Hungary ==
In Austria-Hungary, Heller was also the term used in the Austrian half of the empire for 1/100 of the Austro-Hungarian krone (the other being fillér in the Hungarian half), the currency from 1892 until the demise (1918) of the Empire.

== Czech Republic and Slovakia ==
10 Slovak hellers 1942

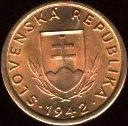
Obverse

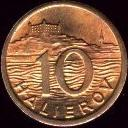
Reverse

The term heller (Czech: haléř, Slovak: halier) was also used for a coin valued at 1/100 of a koruna (crown) in the Czech Republic (Czech koruna) and Slovakia (Slovak koruna), as well as in former Czechoslovakia (Czechoslovak koruna).

Only the currency of the Czech Republic continues to use hellers (haléře), although they survive only as a means of calculation — the Czech National Bank removed the coins themselves from circulation in 2008 and notionally replaced them with rounding to the next koruna.

== Liechtenstein ==
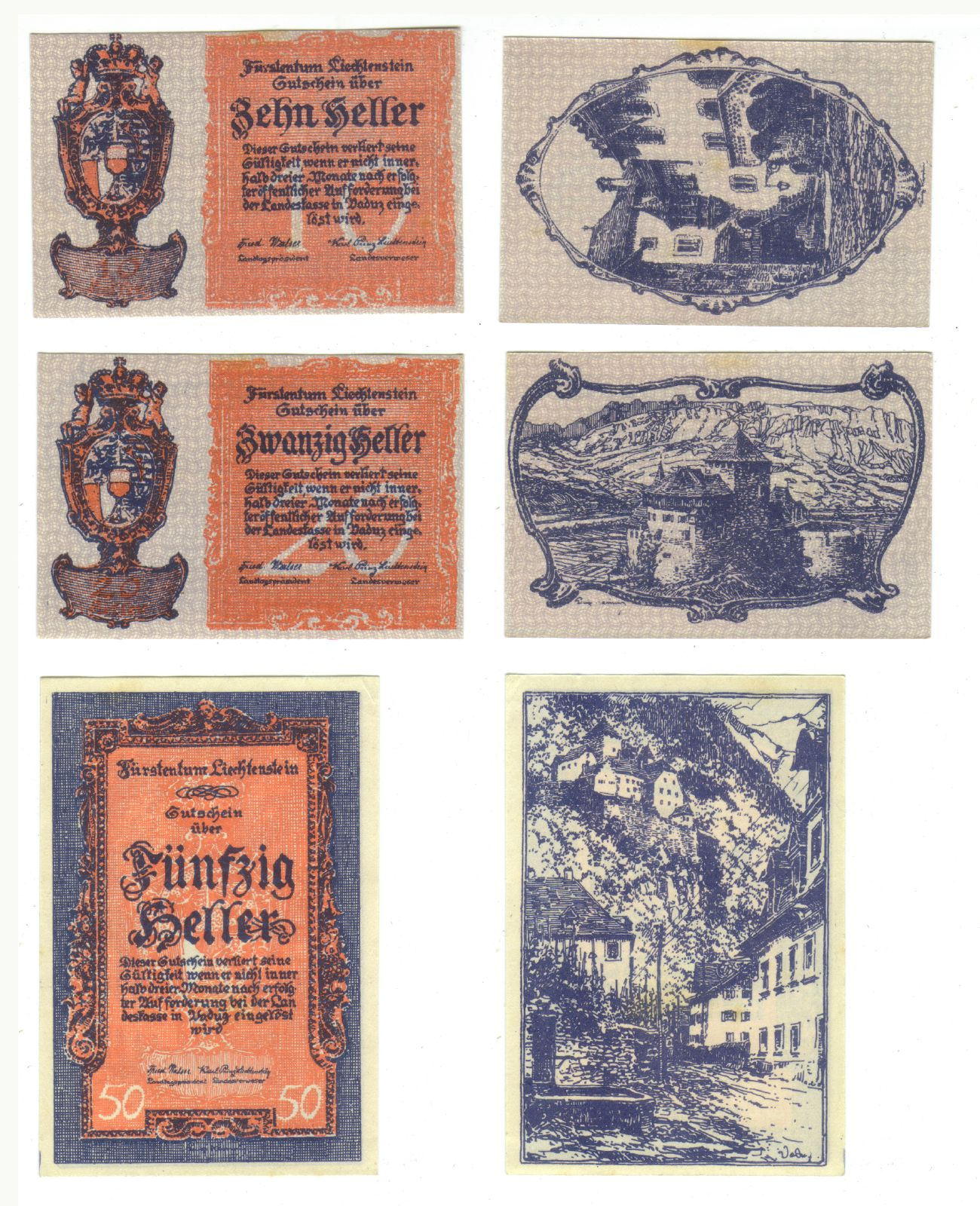
Different heller notes in Liechtenstein

In Liechtenstein, emergency money was in circulation from 1919 to 1924. The denominations were based on the heller.

== Switzerland ==
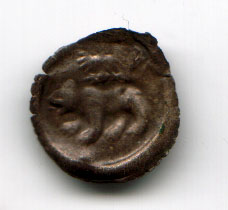
Haller, Berne, 15th century

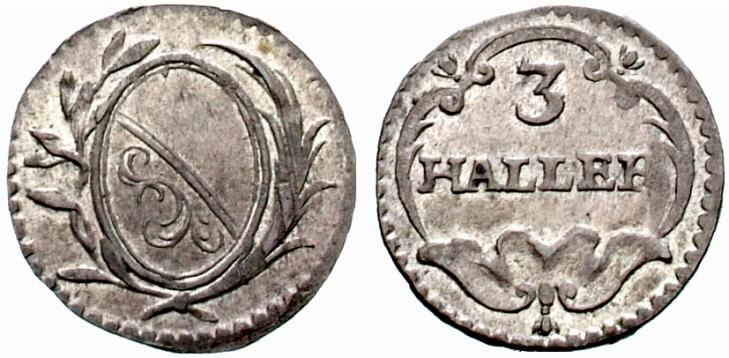
3 Haller, Zurich, date unknown

In the late Middle Ages, the haller was the lowest denomination coin in the area of the Swiss Confederation and corresponded to half a pfennig. From the 1320s, the first south German haller made its way to northern Switzerland, where it replaced the production of small, one-sided pfennigs, which were now known as haller.

From 1370 onwards, this haller established itself as a basic unit in the city-state of Zurich and in the princely Abbey of St. Gallen. As the name of an increasingly devalued coin, the haller existed nominally until the end of the 18th century.

== In culture ==
Ein Heller und ein Batzen is a well-known student and soldier's song by Albert von Schlippenbach (lyrics) and Franz Kugler (music).

The German idiom Das ist keinen roten Heller wert – "that's not worth a red heller" – goes back to the coin's low value and means that something is worthless. Others include eine Schuld auf Heller und Pfennig begleichen ("to settle a debt to the last heller and pfennig" i.e. to settle a debt in full), seinen letzten Heller verlieren ("to lose your last heller") and keinen roten Heller haben ("to not have a red heller" i.e. penniless).

On the A 33 motorway north of the Wünnenberg-Haaren interchange is the motorway services station of Letzter Heller ("Last Heller"). In earlier times there was an inn nearby. After the residents of the surrounding villages had done their shopping in Paderborn and returned to their villages on foot, they paused halfway at the inn and "spent their last heller."

== See also ==
- Scherf
- Coins of the Czech koruna
- Coins of the Slovak koruna
- Czechoslovak koruna
- Bohemian-Moravian koruna
- Øre (Subdivision of Scandinavian crowns)
