= Lozenge (heraldry) =

Heraldic charge

Escutcheon showing Argent, a lozenge gules

The lozenge in heraldry is a diamond-shaped rhombus charge (an object that can be placed on the field of the shield), usually somewhat narrower than it is tall. It is to be distinguished in modern heraldry from the fusil, which is like the lozenge but narrower, though the distinction has not always been as fine and is not always observed even today. A mascle is a voided lozenge—that is, a lozenge with a lozenge-shaped hole in the middle—and the rarer rustre is a lozenge containing a circular hole in the centre. A lozenge throughout has "four corners touching the border of the escutcheon". A field covered in a pattern of lozenges is described as lozengy; similar fields of mascles are masculy, and fusils, fusily (see Variation of the field). In civic heraldry, a lozenge sable is often used in coal-mining communities to represent a lump of coal.

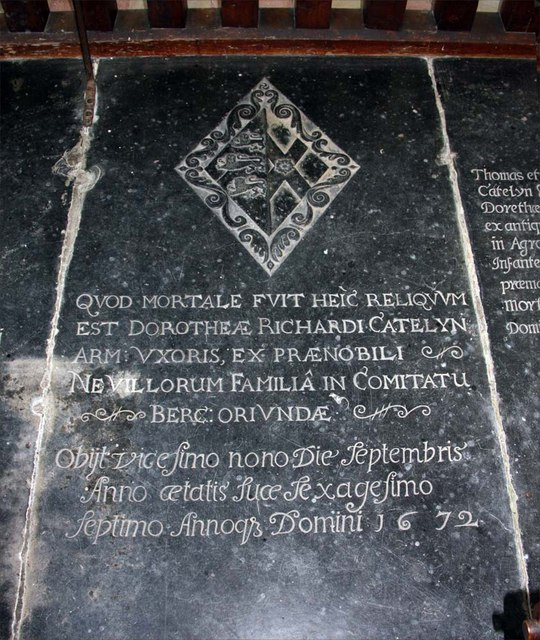
Ledger slab with lozenge arms of Dorothy Neville (1605–1672), Kirby Cane, Norfolk.

A lozenge-shaped escutcheon is used to depict heraldry for a female (in continental Europe especially an unmarried woman), but is also sometimes used as a shape for mural monuments in churches which commemorate women, as a shield was considered inappropriate for women who did not generally participate in combat; for the same reason, clergymen were also sometimes given oval-shaped arms. Funerary hatchments are generally shown within lozenge-shaped frames, for both male and female deceased.

== Types ==
- Lozenge: a diamond-shaped rhombus, usually somewhat narrower than it is tall
- Lozenge throughout or grand Lozenge: a lozenge "with four corners touching the borders of the escutcheon".
- Fusil: a thin lozenge; very much taller than it is wide.
- Mascle: a voided lozenge (i.e. with a largish lozenge-shaped hole)
- Rustre (very rare): a lozenge pierced (i.e. with a smallish round hole)
3 lozenges—Gules, three lozenges argent— Guillaume de Haer (according to Gelre)

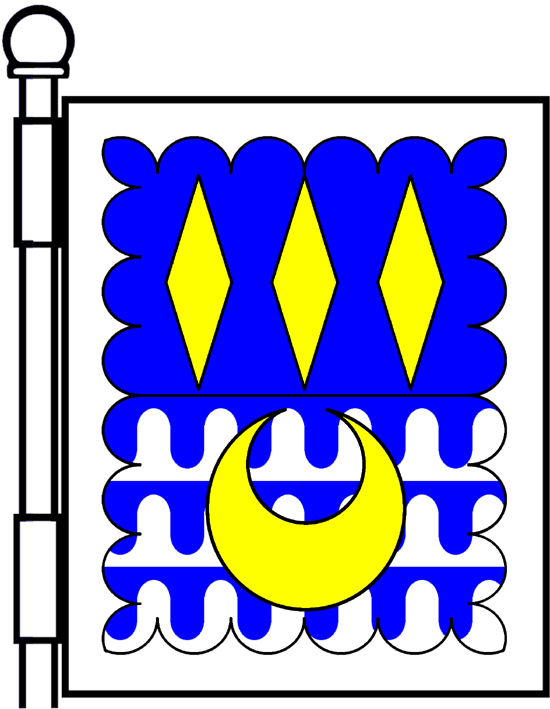
3 fusils—Per fess azure and vair ancient; three fusils in chief and a crescent in base, or; a bordure engrailed argent—Freeman of Murtle, Scotland

9 mascles—Gules, nine mascles or—Rohan family of France

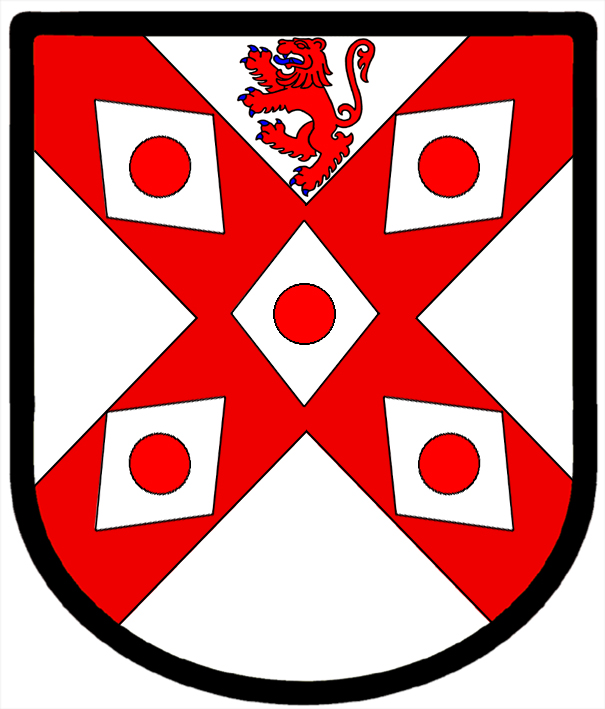
5 rustres—Argent; on a saltire gules five rustres argent, in chief a lion rampant of the second (gules)—Dalrymple of Woodhead, Scotland

"Or, a lozenge sable"

Fusils

Mascles

A rustre

== Lozengy ==
The blason Lozengy is a form of variation of the field or of another charge (for example a chevron lozengy) which consists of lozenges semée, or sown like seeds (Latin: semen, a seed), or strewn across the field, but in an organised contiguous pattern. The arms granted to the Canadian John Francis Cappucci bring an example of lozengy voided, the same as "lozengy" but with a smaller lozenge-shaped hole cut out of each segment.

== Examples ==
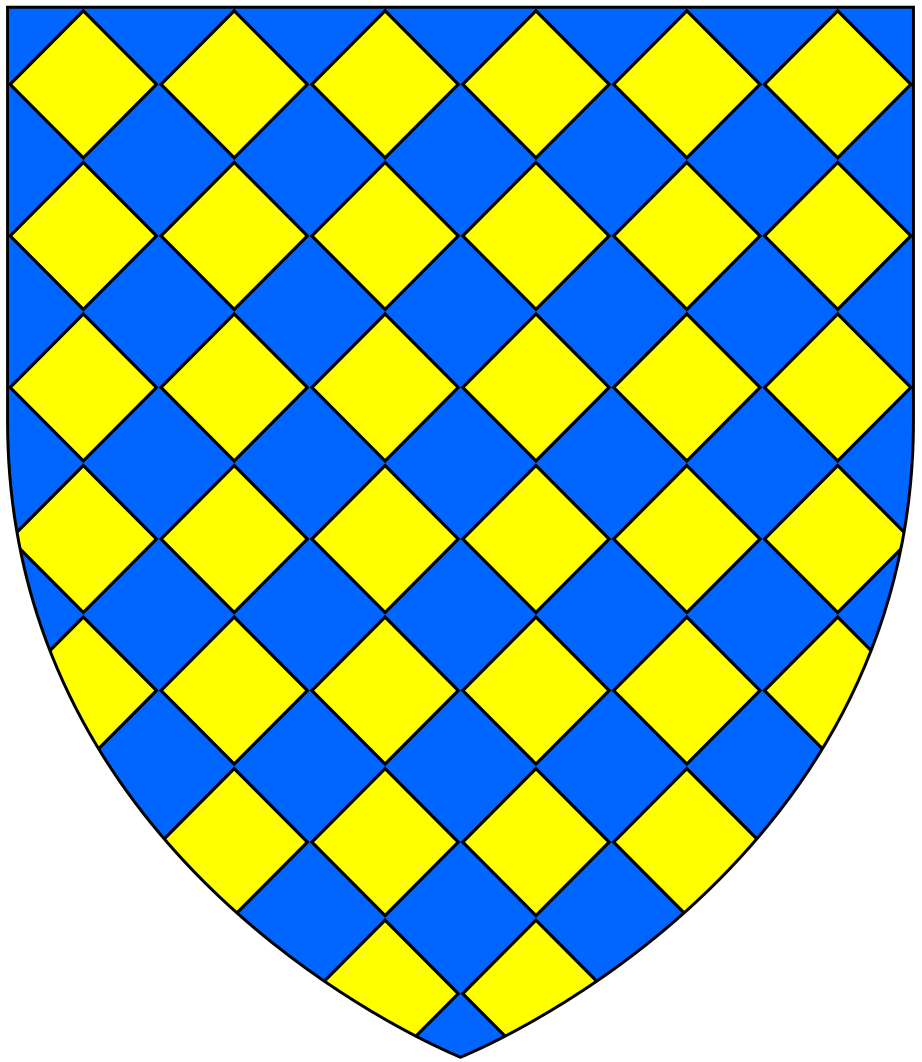
Lozengy or and azure (effectively a field azure semée with lozenges or)

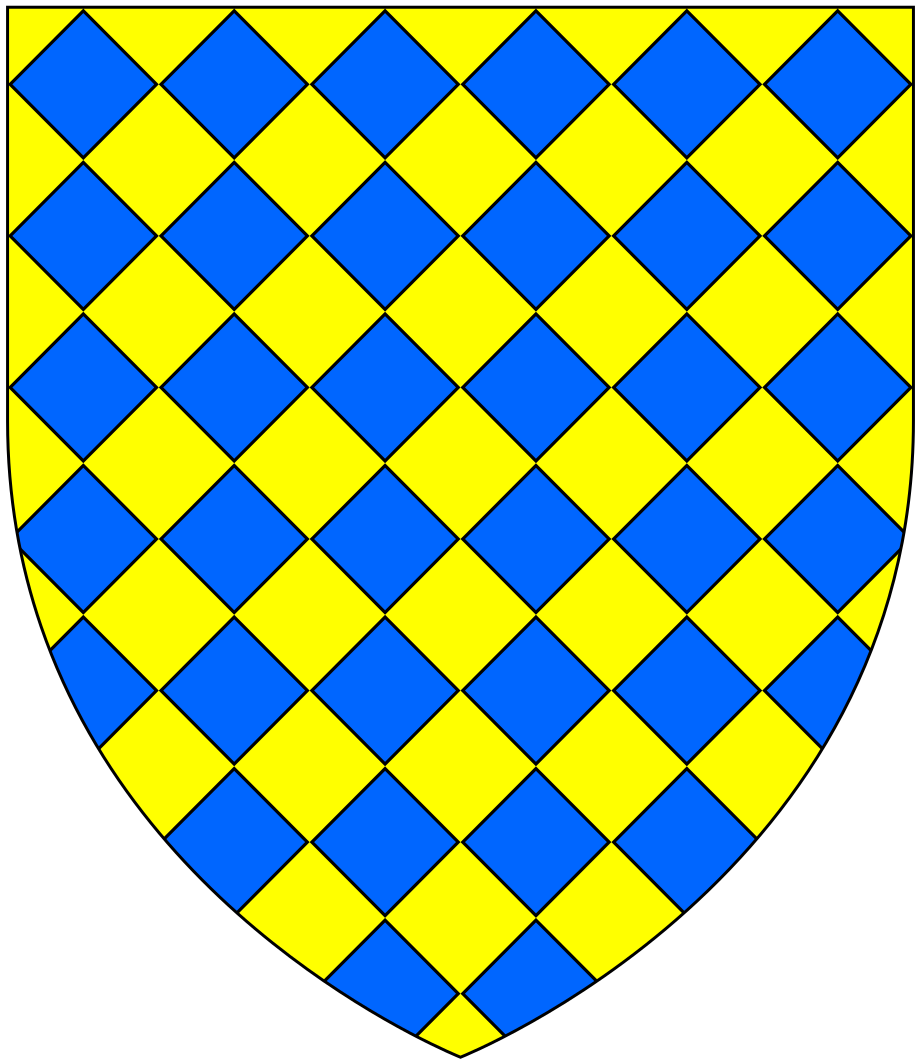
Lozengy azure and or (effectively a field or semée with lozenges azure)

A lozengy shield

An alternative flag of Monaco, blazoned as a field "lozengy gules and argent"

A variant flag of Bavaria, an array of 21 or more lozenges bendwise of white and blue (blazoned as a field "fusilly in bend" or sometimes "bendy lozengy").

The personal arms of Margaret of Parma

The arms of Isabella Clara Eugenia of Spain

The personal coat of arms of Anne, Princess Royal displayed on a lozenge.

Arms of Borredà, a municipality in Catalonia

== Lozenges on flags ==
=== Lozenge ===
Flag of Brazil

Flag of Saint Vincent and the Grenadines

Flag of the Republic of the Rif (1921-1926)

Infantry battalion flag of the United States Navy

Flag of the United States Bureau of Fisheries
(1903–1940)

Flag of Sint Eustatius, Netherlands

Flag of the State of Arkansas, US

Flag of the State of Delaware, US

Flag of Resistencia, Chaco Province, Argentina

Flag of East Lothian, Scotland, United Kingdom

Flag of Shiwa, Iwate, Japan

Flag of Soledar, Bakhmut Raion, Donetsk Oblast, Ukraine

House flag of the Deutsche Ost-Afrika Linie, Germany

Flag of Hamburger SV, Germany

=== Lozenge throughout ===
Flag of Saba, Netherlands

Flag of the Empire of Brazil (1853–1889)

Flag of the Napoleonic Italian Republic

Naval Jack of Free France

Flag of the Second Republic of Venezuela

House Flag of the Batavian Oil Company

House Flag of the Royal Packet Navigation Company (KPM)

Merchant flag of the Republic of Lucca (1801-1805)

=== Mascle ===
Flag of Hormigueros, Puerto Rico, USA

Flag of the University of St Andrews

River Police Pennant, Austrian Armed Forces

Flag of the Red Crystal (Third Protocol of the Geneva Conventions)

Flag of Hamburger SV

==== Mascle-like astral/solar symbol ====
Flag of the Northern Cheyenne

Flag of Resistencia, Chaco Province, Argentina

=== Rustré ===
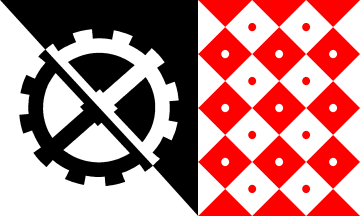
Flag of Behlendorf, Schleswig-Holstein, Germany

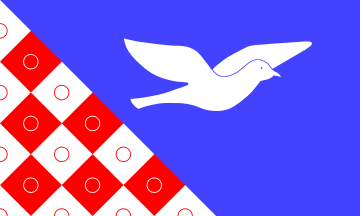
Flag of Duvensee, Schleswig-Holstein, Germany

=== Lozengy ===
Flag of Bavaria (variant)

Civil ensign and national flag (variant) of Monaco

=== Nowy lozengy ===
Flag of New Milford, Connecticut, US

Flag of the Forest Finns

== See also ==
- Weckeler, an historical coin named after its depiction of a heraldic lozenge or lozenged shield
