= Schüsselpfennig =

Type of pfennig coin

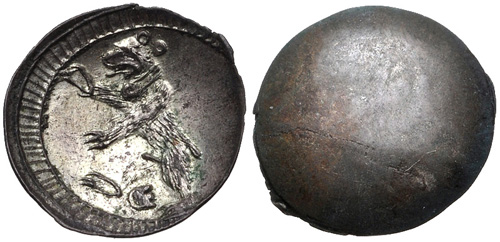
Schusselpfennig from St. Gallen, clipped (silver; diameter 13 mm; 0.26 g)

A Schüsselpfennig ("dish pfennig"), also Gehulchter Pfennig ("hollow pfennig") is so called due to the stamping technique which results in a concave, one-sided type of Pfennig coin. It was probably first minted in 1374 in the Palatinate. Small Schüsselpfennigs that had entered the Electorate of Saxony were referred to there as Näpfchenheller ("saucer hellers").

== History ==
The Schüsselpfennig was widespread and can even be found in dictionaries described as a "small one-sided pfennig made of silver with a rim that is curved upwards like a dish". It was manufactured by minting using only one, upper, stamp on a larger planchet. When the pfennig was stamped, its edge was pressed upwards in the shape of a bowl or dish. The convex shape of the pfennigs proved to be very practical in payment transactions because the small coins were easier to grip than their flat counterparts.

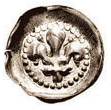
Strasbourg Lilienpfennig

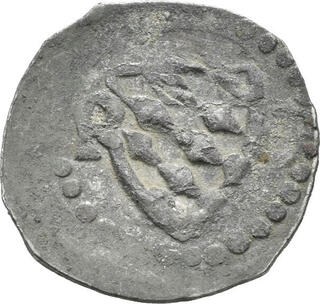
Palatine Weckeler around 1400

The forerunners of the Schüsselpfennigs were the one-sided Engelpfennigs ("angel pfennigs") and Lilienpfennigs ("lily pfennigs") of the Free Imperial City of Strasbourg and Trier pfennigs that were already being coined at the beginning of the 14th century. These silver pfennigs had a diameter of about 14 to 17 mm and weighed approximately 0.32 to 0.45 g. They are called Ewig Pfenniges ("eternal pfennigs") because, unlike most bracteates, they did not have to be routinely exchanged for a fee.

The so-called Palatine Weckeler with its image of a lozenged shield (Weckenschild) or the lozenge (Wecken) alone without a shield were minted from about 1390. From the 15th century, its characteristic feature was its curved shape and the thick beaded circle that surrounded the coin image. The beaded circle does not occur on the later Schüsselpfennigs of the 16th to 18th centuries.

According to the Aschaffenburg convention of 1424, the Schüsselpfennigs had a fine weight of 0.20 g and rough weight of 0.39 g. There were also half pfennigs. The coins issued later had a much lower quality and value. The distribution of Schüsselpfennigs included southern and southwestern Germany, western Germany, Hesse, the Harz and Central Germany. Switzerland also had this type of pfennig minted.

Up until the 18th century, Schüsselpfennigs were primarily coined in the mints of the Harz Mountains. However, the last of these pfennigs were minted in Switzerland by the Canton of St. Gallen; these remained undated even up to 1822.

=== Näpfchenheller ===
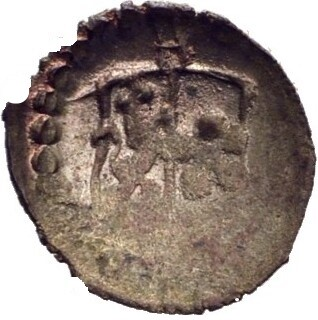
Näpfchenheller c. 1680, Solms-Hohensolms

In Electorate of Saxony, low-value Schüsselpfennigs made by the various mint lords, for example of Nassau-Holzappel, Solms-Hohensolms or Leiningen-Westernburg, became known as "invaders". They were referred to as Näpgen-Heller (Näpfchenheller = "saucer hellers") in Saxon documents from 1668. In some areas of Saxony, for example in the Ore Mountains, they became a nuisance, especially to the clergy. The population preferred to threw the lower value Näpfchenhellers into the collection bag, which significantly reduced income from the collection. This led in places, for example in Annaberg, to the introduction of special church pfennigs (Kirchenpfennige).

The saucer- or bowl-shaped pfennigs had a very low silver content weight of about 0.15 g with a fine weight of 0.004 g. They were minted either by counterfeiters or, from 1683, by the mint master Paul Heuser at Hohensolms in defiance of the mint laws. Their circulation areas were often those of great poverty among the population. They were still in circulation in the Ore Mountains until the end of the 17th century.

== Characteristics ==
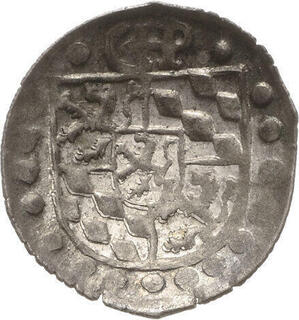
Palatine Schüsselpfennig c. 1550

The forerunners of the Schüsselpfennigs came from the German imperial city of Strasbourg and from Trier from the beginning of the 14th century. They already have the typical bowl or saucer shape with a pearl circle surrounding the coin design (see the Strasbourg Lilienpfennig). They are similar to even small bracteates, but are not made of thin sheet metal.

The Schüsselpfennigs that followed later had a characteristic thick pearl circle that gradually became less noticeable or disappeared in later coins from the 16th to the 18th century. The one-sided concave pfennig type got its shape from a coin die that was smaller in diameter than the blank. As a result, the coin metal was compressed into a structure in the embossing area and its perimeter was bent upwards. In the case of the late Swiss Schüsselpfennigs, however, the stamping seems to have been carried out with a convex die on a smooth, hollow base (see the Schüsselpfennig in the picture above).

== See also ==
- Saxon coinage

== Literature ==
- Kahnt, Helmut (2005). Das große Münzlexikon von A bis Z., Regenstauf.
- Fengler, Heinz, Gerd Gierow and Willy Unger (1976). transpress Lexikon Numismatik, Berlin.
- Von Schrötter, Friedrich (ed.), N. Bauer, K. Regling, A. Suhle, R. Vasmer and J. Wilcke (1970) [reprint of the original 1930 edn.] Wörterbuch der Münzkunde, Berlin: de Gruyter.
