= Scherf =

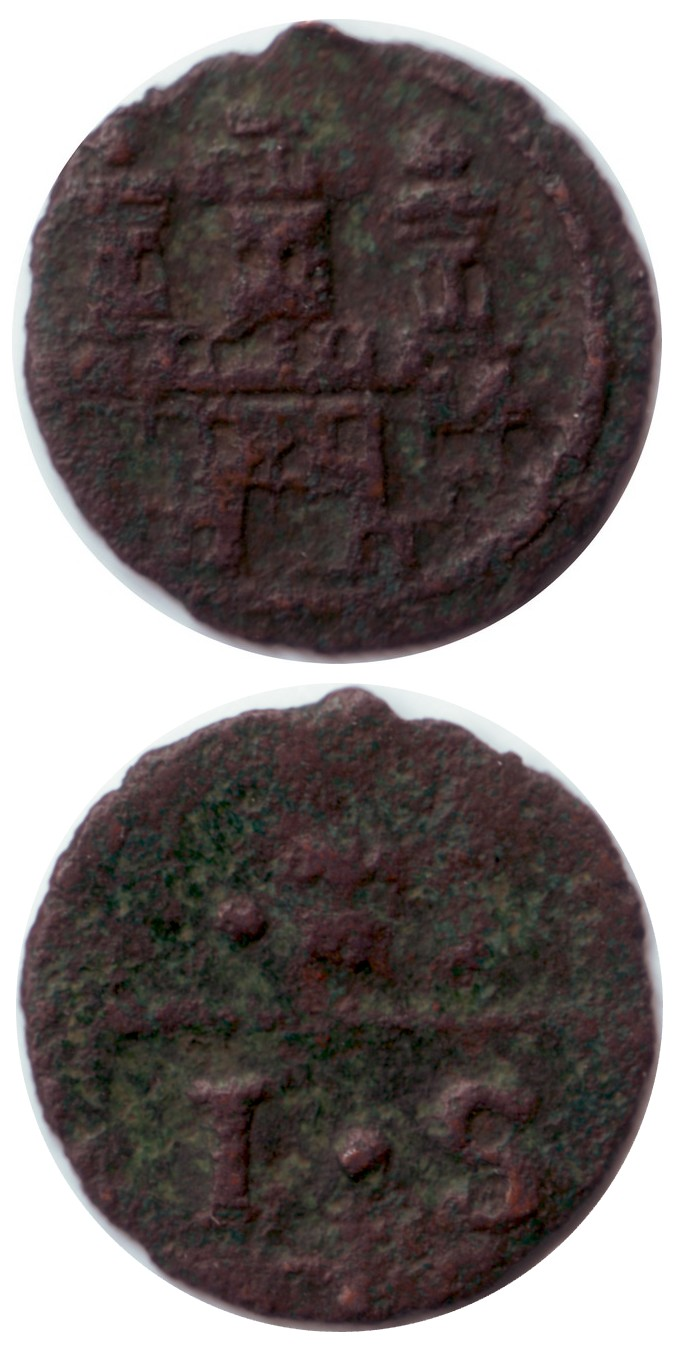
Scherf, Hamburg, 16th century

A Scherf (also Schärff or scharfer Pfennig, lit. 'sharp pfennig') was a low-value silver coin used in Erfurt and other cities of the Holy Roman Empire from the Middle Ages to the 18th century. The name was later also given to a copper coin with a value of about half a pfennig. The simple Scherf was only rarely minted; coins of 3, 6, and 12 Scherf were more common, most recently in 1777 in Lüneburg.

== Name ==
The Old High German name Scherf and Middle High German scerpf, scherpf, scherff, or scherf are probably related to the Middle High German words scherben and scharben which mean "to cut in" and are therefore associated with Scherbe, "shard" or "fragment". These silver pennies had predetermined breaking points so that they could be physically divided into smaller values which, after being broken off, became "shards".

If necessary, a 1-pfennig piece could simply be divided into two halves, hence the naming Helbing, Hälbling, Helblinger, or Helling ("halfling"). However, the scherf should be distinguished from the heller, although this was also worth half a pfennig at times. The Hälbling often appears under the name Obol or Obolus, but should not be confused with the ancient Greek obolus.

== Scherflein and verscherbeln ==
Scherflein is the diminutive form of Scherf. This term has survived to this day in an idiom that goes back to Martin Luther's Bible translation LUT: "sein Scherflein zu etwas beitragen" ("his mite to contribute something"). This refers to a small but commendable contribution.

The expression verscherbeln meaning "sell below value" is possibly also derived from Late Middle High German scher(p)f.

== Literature ==
- Franz Appell: Zur Münzgeschichte Erfurts. Beiträge zum Erfurter Münzwesen. In: Mitteilungen für die Geschichte und Altertumskunde von Erfurt 24, 1903 and 53, 1940.
