= Planchet =

Round metal disk that is ready to be struck as a coin

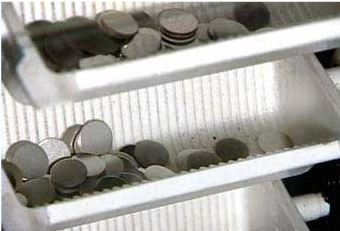
Planchets in a press feed system, on their way to the stamping press.

A planchet English: /ˈplæntʃət/ is a round metal disk that is ready to be struck as a coin. An older word for planchet is flan. They are also referred to as blanks.

== History ==
The preparation of the flan or planchet has varied over the years. In ancient times, the flan was heated before striking because the metal that the coin dies were made of was not as hard as dies today, and the dies would have worn faster and broken sooner had the flan not been heated to a high temperature to soften it.

An unusual method was used to mint the one-sided, bowl-shaped pfennigs of the Holy Roman Empire. The planchet used for these so-called Schüsselpfennigs was larger than the coin die itself. The coins were made by striking with only one upper die on the larger planchet. As a result, the perimeter of the planchet was pressed upwards in the shape of a bowl or plate. Until the 18th century they were minted mainly in the Harz Mountains. The curved shape of the pfennig was very useful for handling small change because it was easier to grip than a flat coin.

== Modern striking ==
Today's dies are made from hardened steel, and the presses use many thousands of pounds of force to strike coins (varying according to the size of the coin and the complexity and relief of the design). In addition, today's coins have much lower relief than ancient coins. Because of this, the planchet no longer needs to be heated immediately before striking, although it is annealed by heating and slow cooling which softens the coin.

== Preparation ==
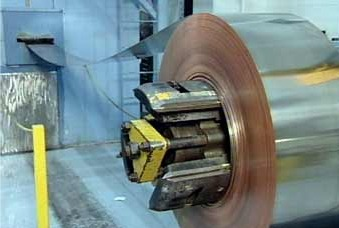
A 6,000-pound coil is fed into a blanking press at the US Mint.

Preparation of the modern planchet involves several steps. First, the metal (or metals in the case of clad or multilayered coins) is rolled out into a large roll or sheet of the correct thickness. This process is often done by third parties, not by the mint itself. These flat rolls or sheets of metal are then punched out into round blanks that are a little larger than the coin being struck. The blanks are then subjected to an annealing process that softens the metal through heating to approximately 750 degrees Celsius (1400 degrees Fahrenheit) and are then slowly air cooled. They are then washed to remove residue from the annealing process and dried.

== Completion ==
Finally, the planchet is struck. After striking, it becomes a coin and is no longer a planchet. Occasionally, a planchet will escape the mint without having been struck. This is a blank planchet error, and is usually worth a few dollars for modern coins. Occasionally, blank planchets can be rare and valuable, such is the case for Morgan Dollar blank planchets, although authentication and appraisal by a coin grading service is highly recommended for such pieces as they would be fairly easy to counterfeit.

== See also ==
- Coining (mint)
- Counterfeit
- Punch-marked coins
- Coining press
