= Crown (currency) =

Currency of several nations

Crown is the English translation of a unit of currency used in Norway, Sweden, Denmark (including the Faroe Islands and Greenland), Iceland, and the Czech Republic.

== Alternative names ==
"Crown", or its equivalent in other languages, is derived from the Latin word corona. The symbol for crown is usually "kr". Some countries use another symbol for it like Íkr, -, Kč.

The local name for "crown" depends on the official language of the country.

=== Current use ===
- Czech: koruna
- Norwegian and Danish: krone
- Icelandic and Faroese: króna
- Swedish: krona
- Northern Sami: ruvdna

=== Historical use ===
- Estonian: kroon
- German: Krone (capital letter k)
- Hungarian: korona
- Slovak: koruna

== Current use of a currency called crown ==
Country	Currency	Period	Notes
Czech Republic	Czech koruna	1993–present	Replaced Czechoslovak koruna.
Denmark	Danish krone	1873–present	Replaced Danish rigsdaler
Faroe Islands	Faroese króna	1949–present	Form of Danish krone.
Iceland	Icelandic króna	1922–present	Replaced Danish krone.
Norway	Norwegian krone	1875–present	Replaced Norwegian speciedaler.
Sweden	Swedish krona	1873–present	Replaced Swedish riksdaler

== Historical use of a currency called crown ==
Country	Currency	Period	Notes	Ref
Austria	Austrian krone	1918–1925	Replaced by Austrian schilling.	
Austrian Netherlands	Austrian Netherlands kronenthaler	1755–1794	Replaced by the French franc	
Austria-Hungary	Austro-Hungarian krone	1892–1918	Replaced by Austrian krone and Hungarian korona.	
Protectorate of Bohemia and Moravia	Bohemian and Moravian koruna	1939–1945	Replaced by Czechoslovak koruna.	
Czechoslovakia	Czechoslovak koruna	1919–1939; 1945–1993	Replaced by Czech koruna and Slovak koruna.	
Estonia	Estonian kroon	1928–1940; 1992–2011	Soviet rouble used in-between. Replaced by euro.	
Free State of Fiume	Fiume krone	1919–1920	Replaced by Italian Lira	
Hungary	Hungarian korona	1919–1926	Abandoned due to inflation. Replaced by Hungarian pengő.	
Liechtenstein	Liechtenstein krone	1898–1921	Replaced by Liechtenstein franc	
Slovakia	Slovak koruna	1993–2008	Replaced by euro.	
Slovakia	Slovak koruna	1939–1945	Replaced by Czechoslovak koruna.	
Kingdom of Yugoslavia	Yugoslav krone	1918–1920	Replaced by Yugoslav dinar	

== See also ==
- Crown (British coin)
