= Mine Rescue Decoration =

- Type: Medal
- Awarded for: Courage during mine rescue operations, or meritorious service to a mine rescue service
- Presented by: Austria
- Status: Active
- Established: February 24, 1954
- Ribbon bar of the award

Precedence
- Next (higher): Federal Honor Decoration (Bundes-Ehrenzeichen)
- Next (lower): Military Recognition Medal (Militär-Anerkennungs-medaille)

The Mine Rescue Decoration (German: Grubenwehrehrenzeichen) is a state award of the Republic of Austria, established on February 24, 1954 by the National Council. The award is presented by the Federal Ministry of Trade and Reconstruction, currently known as the Ministry of Digital and Economic Affairs, to both members and non-members of the mine rescue services.

== Criteria ==
The Mine Rescue Decoration can be awarded for the following reasons:

- to members of a mine rescue service who made a special contribution to a rescue operation resulting in loss of their life.
- to members of a mine rescue service who have provided satisfactory service for a period of at least 15 years.
- to former members of a mine rescue service who were unable to complete 15 years of satisfactory service due to work-related illness or injury.
- to any individual who, while under supervision of the mountain authorities, rescues or assists in rescuing an individual at the cost of, or at great risk to, their own life.
- to any individual who has made a special contribution to the mine rescue services.

Wear of the Mine Rescue Decoration is protected under Austrian federal law, and the unauthorised wear of any component of the award by a non-awardee is punishable with a fine, which was originally set at 300 schillings.

== Insignia ==
In addition to the full-sized medal, awardees also receive a certificate, miniature medal, ribbon bar, lapel pin, and rosette. The ribbon is made up of two thick stripes of black and green, bordered by thin stripes of white and red. On the full-sized medal, the ribbon is arranged as an Austrian trifold, while on the miniature medals, it is arranged as a drape. The medal is a 40 mm bronze circular medallion, featuring on the obverse a Maltese cross with outgoing rays, framed by a laurel wreath, and superimposed by a crossed hammer and pick, the traditional symbol of miners. On the reverse is the Austrian Coat of Arms, with the inscription "Für Verdienste im Grubenrettungsdienst" (English:For merits in mine rescue service).

== See also ==
- Honours system in Austria
- Lassing mining disaster
- Mine rescue
- Mining in Austria
- Mine Rescue Medal
