= Taxi Orange =

Taxi Orange was an alternative to the Big Brother reality show. It was broadcast by the public television channel ORF. The idea, like Big Brother, was to lock up a group of people in a closed environment, only allowed to leave operating an orange taxi within the city of Vienna as a source of income and interaction with the world outside.

The habitat and the taxi interior were videotaped and used to produce a 30-minute daily summary. Each week, viewers elected a winner who had to decide on the exclusion of one colleague. The winner received 1 million Schillings. Two seasons (2000, 2001) were produced.

The show was adapted into Turkish as "Biri Bizi Gözetliyor" (Someone is watching us).
