= Law Enforcement Merit Decoration =

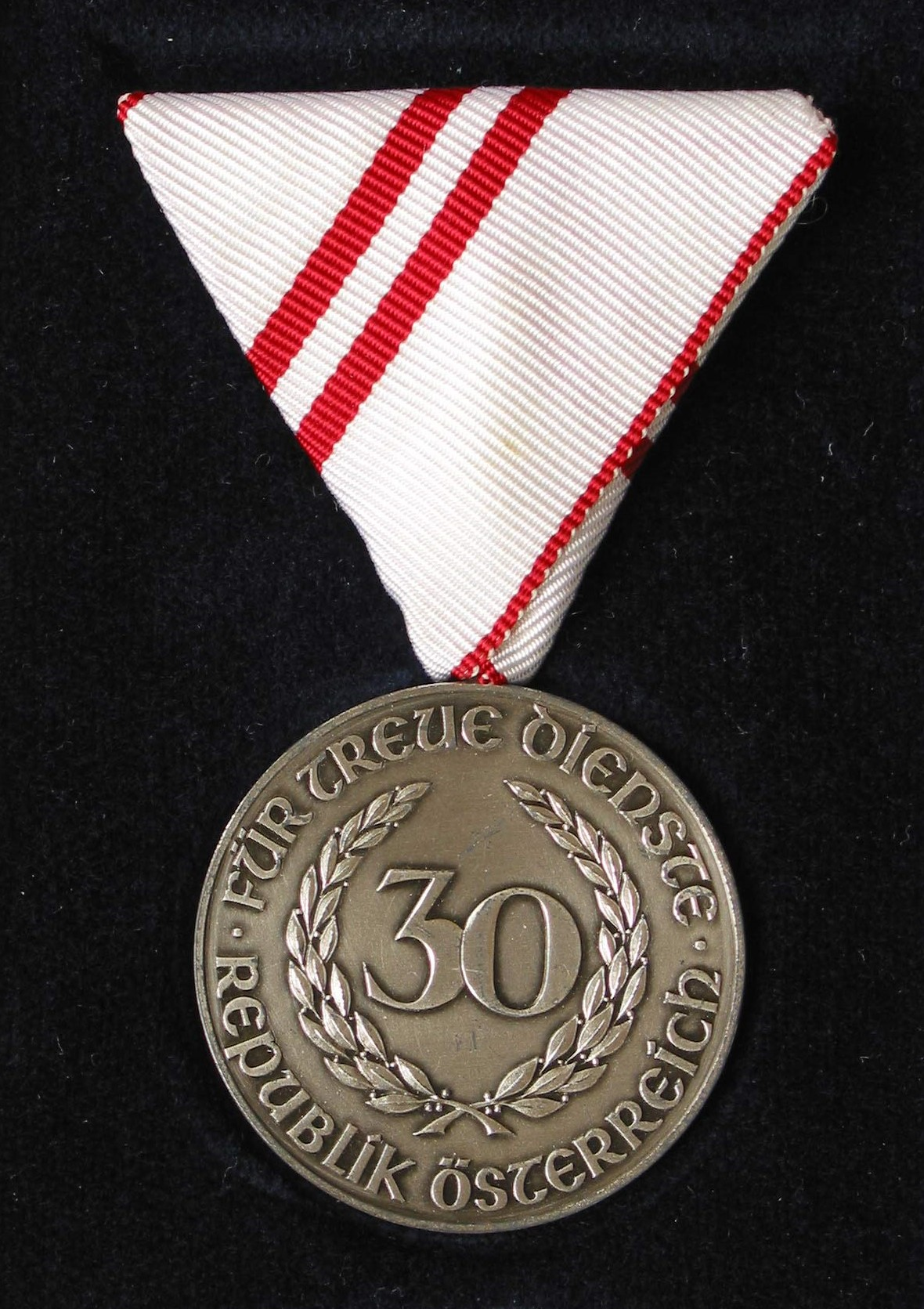
- Law Enforcement Merit Decoration
- Type: Medal
- Awarded for: 30 years of flawless service, or outstanding achievement or bravery
- Presented by: Austria
- Eligibility: Officials and civil servants of the Austrian law enforcement agencies
- Status: Active
- Established: December 1, 1985
- Ribbon bar of Law Enforcement Merit Decoration

Precedence
- Next (higher): Austrian Armed Forces Operations Medal (de:Einsatzmedaille des Österreichischen Bundesheeres)
- Next (lower): Military Service Award (Wehrdienstzeichen)

The Law Enforcement Merit Decoration (German: Exekutivdienstzeichen) is a state award of the Republic of Austria, established by federal law on December 1, 1985.

== Criteria ==
The Law Enforcement Merit Decoration is awarded for 30 years of flawless service as an executive officer or civil servant in one of the law enforcement organisations of Austria. It may also be awarded for outstanding performance and bravery in the face of danger, and outstanding achievements in rescue or relief operations resulting in extreme physical or mental stress.

== Appearance ==
The decoration consists of a circular silver medal, with a diameter of 40 mm. The obverse shows the inscription "30", surrounded by a laurel wreath and the inscription "Für treue Dienste - Republik Österreich" (English: For faithful services - Republic of Austria). The reverse of the medal shows the Austrian federal coat of arms. The ribbon is folded in a triangular fashion, 45 mm wide, white, with two 3 mm red central stripes, and narrow red edges.

== Wear ==
In both the uniform and civilian clothes, the decoration is worn on the left side of the chest. Additionally, the band clip may be worn while in uniform, and the miniature medal or ribbon bar may be worn while in civilian clothes.

== Regulations ==
Once awarded, the decoration becomes the property of the awardee, and may only be worn by them. Possession may not be transferred while the awardee is alive. After their death, the decoration may only be used for remembrance purposes. Failure to comply with these provisions is punishable with a fine, originally set at up to 220 euros.

== See also ==
- Honours system in Austria
- Law enforcement in Austria
- Ministry of the Interior (Austria)
- Ministry of Justice (Austria)
