= Commemorative coins of Austria =

This is the list of commemorative coins of Austria in schilling, minted by Münze Österreich.

== 2 schilling ==
- 2 schillings - silver - Franz Schubert - 1928
- 2 schillings - silver - Theodor Billroth - 1929
- 2 schillings - silver - Walther von der Vogelweide - 1930
- 2 schillings - silver - Wolfgang Amadeus Mozart - 1931
- 2 schillings - silver - Joseph Haydn - 1932
- 2 schillings - silver - Ignaz Seipel - 1933
- 2 schillings - silver - Engelbert Dollfuß - 1934
- 2 schillings - silver - Karl Lueger - 1935
- 2 schillings - silver - Prince Eugene of Savoy - 1936
- 2 schillings - silver - Karlskirche - 1937

== 5 schilling ==
- 5 schillings - silver - Magna Mater Austriae (Mariazell) - 1934-1936

== 20 schilling ==
- 20 schillings - aluminium bronze - Group of nine men - 1980-1981, 1991-1993
- 20 schillings - aluminium bronze - Joseph Haydn - 1982, 1991-1993
- 20 schillings - aluminium bronze - Hochosterwitz Castle - 1983, 1991-1993
- 20 schillings - aluminium bronze - Grafenegg Castle - 1984, 1991-1993
- 20 schillings - aluminium bronze - Diocese of Linz - 1985, 1991-1993
- 20 schillings - aluminium bronze - Georgenberg Pact - 1986, 1991-1993
- 20 schillings - aluminium bronze - Johann Ernst von Thun - 1987, 1991-1993
- 20 schillings - aluminium bronze - Tyrol - 1989, 1991-1993
- 20 schillings - aluminium bronze - Martinsturm Bregenz - 1990-1993
- 20 schillings - aluminium bronze - Franz Grillparzer - 1991-1993
- 20 schillings - aluminium bronze - Vienna Mint - 1994
- 20 schillings - aluminium bronze - Krems an der Donau - 1995
- 20 schillings - aluminium bronze - Anton Bruckner - 1996
- 20 schillings - aluminium bronze - St. Stephen's Cathedral, Vienna - 1997
- 20 schillings - aluminium bronze - Michael Pacher - 1998
- 20 schillings - aluminium bronze - Hugo von Hofmannsthal - 1999
- 20 schillings - aluminium bronze - Austrian Stamps - 2000
- 20 schillings - aluminium bronze - Johann Nestroy - 2001

== 25 schilling ==
- 25 schillings - silver - Reopening of Vienna State Opera and Burgtheater - 1955
- 25 schillings - silver - Wolfgang Amadeus Mozart - 1956
- 25 schillings - silver - Mariazell - 1957
- 25 schillings - silver - Carl Auer von Welsbach - 1958
- 25 schillings - silver - Archduke John of Austria - 1959
- 25 schillings - silver - 1920 Carinthian plebiscite - 1960
- 25 schillings - silver - Burgenland - 1961
- 25 schillings - silver - Anton Bruckner - 1962
- 25 schillings - silver - Prince Eugene of Savoy - 1963
- 25 schillings - silver - Franz Grillparzer - 1964
- 25 schillings - silver - Vienna University of Technology - 1965
- 25 schillings - silver - Ferdinand Raimund - 1966
- 25 schillings - silver - Maria Theresa - 1967
- 25 schillings - silver - Johann Lukas von Hildebrandt - 1968
- 25 schillings - silver - Peter Rosegger - 1969
- 25 schillings - silver - Franz Lehár - 1970
- 25 schillings - silver - Wiener Börse - 1971
- 25 schillings - silver - Carl Michael Ziehrer - 1972
- 25 schillings - silver - Max Reinhardt - 1973

== 50 schilling ==
- 50 schillings - silver - Tyrolean Rebellion - 1959
- 50 schillings - silver - Tyrol - 1963
- 50 schillings - silver - Winter Olympic Games Innsbruck - 1964
- 50 schillings - silver - University of Vienna - 1965
- 50 schillings - silver - Oesterreichische Nationalbank - 1966
- 50 schillings - silver - The Blue Danube Waltz - 1967
- 50 schillings - silver - 50 years Republic of Austria - 1968
- 50 schillings - silver - Maximilian I, Holy Roman Emperor - 1969
- 50 schillings - silver - University of Innsbruck - 1970
- 50 schillings - silver - Karl Renner - 1970
- 50 schillings - silver - Julius Raab - 1971
- 50 schillings - silver - University of Salzburg - 1972
- 50 schillings - silver - University of Natural Resources and Life Sciences, Vienna - 1972
- 50 schillings - silver - Bummerlhaus Steyr - 1973
- 50 schillings - silver - Theodor Körner - 1973
- 50 schillings - silver - Wiener Internationale Gartenschau 74 - 1974
- 50 schillings - silver - Gendarmerie (Austria) - 1974
- 50 schillings - silver - Salzburg Cathedral - 1974
- 50 schillings - silver - ORF (broadcaster) - 1974
- 50 schillings - silver - Franz Schubert - 1978
- 50 schillings - bi-metallic aluminium bronze/Magnimat 7 - "Ostarrîchi" - 1996
- 50 schillings - bi-metallic aluminium bronze/Magnimat 7 - "Vienna Secession" - 1997
- 50 schillings - bi-metallic aluminium bronze/Magnimat 7 - "EU Presidency" - 1998
- 50 schillings - bi-metallic aluminium bronze/Magnimat 7 - "Konrad Lorenz" - 1998
- 50 schillings - bi-metallic aluminium bronze/Magnimat 7 - "Economic and Monetary Union of the European Union" - 1999
- 50 schillings - bi-metallic aluminium bronze/Magnimat 7 - "Johann Strauss II" - 1999
- 50 schillings - bi-metallic aluminium bronze/Magnimat 7 - "Sigmund Freud" -2000
- 50 schillings - bi-metallic aluminium bronze/Magnimat 7 - "Ferdinand Porsche" - 2000
- 50 schillings - bi-metallic aluminium bronze/Magnimat 7 - "Schilling Era" - 2001

== 100 schilling ==
- 100 schillings - silver - Johann Strauss II - 1975
- 100 schillings - silver - Austrian State Treaty - 1975
- 100 schillings - silver - 50 years Schilling currency - 1975
- 100 schillings - silver - Winter Olympic Games Innsbruck (1) - 1976
- 100 schillings - silver - Winter Olympic Games Innsbruck (2) - 1976
- 100 schillings - silver - Winter Olympic Games Innsbruck (3) - 1976
- 100 schillings - silver - Winter Olympic Games Innsbruck (4) - 1976
- 100 schillings - silver - Burgtheater - 1976
- 100 schillings - silver - Carinthia - 1976
- 100 schillings - silver - Johann Nestroy - 1976
- 100 schillings - silver - Kremsmünster Abbey - 1977
- 100 schillings - silver - Hohensalzburg Castle - 1977
- 100 schillings - silver - Mint Hall in Tirol - 1977
- 100 schillings - silver - Gmunden - 1978
- 100 schillings - silver - Battle on the Marchfeld - 1978
- 100 schillings - silver - Villach - 1978
- 100 schillings - silver - Arlberg Road Tunnel - 1978
- 100 schillings - silver - Wiener Neustadt Cathedral - 1979
- 100 schillings - silver - Innviertel - 1979
- 100 schillings - silver - Vienna International Centre - 1979
- 100 schillings - silver - Bregenz Festival and Congress House - 1979
- 100 schillings - silver - Wolfgang Amadeus Mozart, Vienna - 1991
- 100 schillings - silver - Wolfgang Amadeus Mozart, Salzburg - 1991
- 100 schillings - silver - Rudolph I of Habsburg - 1991
- 100 schillings - silver - Maximilian I, Holy Roman Emperor - 1992
- 100 schillings - silver - Otto Nicolai - 1992
- 100 schillings - silver - Leopold I, Holy Roman Emperor - 1992
- 100 schillings - silver - 1848 Revolution - 1994
- 100 schillings - silver - Emperor Franz Joseph I of Austria - 1994
- 100 schillings - silver - First Austrian Republic - 1995
- 100 schillings - silver - Leopold III - 1996
- 100 schillings - silver - Emperor Maximilian I of Mexico - 1997
- 100 schillings - silver - Crown Prince Rudolf of Austria - 1998
- 100 schillings - silver - Archduke Franz Ferdinand of Austria - 1999
- 100 schillings - silver - The Celts - 2000
- 100 schillings - silver - The Romans - 2000
- 100 schillings - silver - The Holy Roman Empire - 2001
- 100 schillings - silver - The Middle Ages - 2001
- 100 schillings - bi-metallic Ag/Ti - Communications - 2000
- 100 schillings - bi-metallic Ag/Ti - Transportation - 2001

== 200 schilling ==
- 200 schillings - silver - International Olympic Committee, skiing - 1995
- 200 schillings - silver - International Olympic Committee, figure skating - 1995

== 500 schilling ==
- 500 schillings - silver - Steyr - 1980
- 500 schillings - silver - Austrian State Treaty - 1980
- 500 schillings - silver - Maria Theresa - 1980
- 500 schillings - silver - Austrian Red Cross - 1980
- 500 schillings - silver - Verdun Altar Klosterneuburg Abbey - 1981
- 500 schillings - silver - Anton Wildgans - 1981
- 500 schillings - silver - Otto Bauer - 1981
- 500 schillings - silver - 1782 Edict of Tolerance - 1981
- 500 schillings - silver - St. Severin - 1982
- 500 schillings - silver - Printing in Austria - 1982
- 500 schillings - silver - Mariazell - 1982
- 500 schillings - silver - Leopold Figl - 1982
- 500 schillings - silver - Show Jumping World Cup - 1983
- 500 schillings - silver - Rathaus, Vienna - 1983
- 500 schillings - silver - Katholikentag - 1983
- 500 schillings - silver - Austrian Parliament Building - 1983
- 500 schillings - silver - Tyrolean Rebellion - 1984
- 500 schillings - silver - Lake Constance Shipping - 1984
- 500 schillings - silver - Stams Abbey - 1984
- 500 schillings - silver - Fanny Elßler - 1984
- 500 schillings - silver - University of Graz - 1985
- 500 schillings - silver - Peace in Austria - 1985
- 500 schillings - silver - Bregenz - 1985
- 500 schillings - silver - Leopold III, Duke of Austria - 1985
- 500 schillings - silver - Prince Eugene of Savoy - 1986
- 500 schillings - silver - Haller Taler - 1986
- 500 schillings - silver - St. Florian Abbey - 1986
- 500 schillings - silver - KSZE conference, Vienna - 1986
- 500 schillings - silver - Wolf Dietrich Raitenau - 1987
- 500 schillings - silver - Railway in Austria - 1987
- 500 schillings - silver - Heiligenkreuz Abbey - 1987
- 500 schillings - silver - St. Georgenberg-Fiecht Abbey - 1988
- 500 schillings - silver - Pope John Paul II in Austria - 1988
- 500 schillings - silver - Victor Adler - 1988
- 500 schillings - silver - Gustav Klimt/Art Nouveau - 1989
- 500 schillings - silver - Koloman Moser/Stained Glass - 1989
- 500 schillings - silver - Egon Schiele/Expressionism - 1990
- 500 schillings - silver - Oskar Kokoschka/Expressionism - 1990
- 500 schillings - silver - Dr. Karl Böhm - 1991
- 500 schillings - silver - Herbert von Karajan - 1991
- 500 schillings - silver - Gustav Mahler - 1992
- 500 schillings - silver - Richard Strauss - 1992
- 500 schillings - silver - The Lakes Region - 1993
- 500 schillings - silver - The Alpine Region - 1993
- 500 schillings - silver - The River Region - 1994
- 500 schillings - silver - Pannonian Region - 1994
- 500 schillings - silver - The Hill Country - 1995
- 500 schillings - silver - The Alpine Foothills - 1995
- 500 schillings - silver - The Mill Region - 1996
- 500 schillings - silver - The Towns - 1996
- 500 schillings - silver - Ironsmith - 1997
- 500 schillings - silver - Stone Mason - 1997
- 500 schillings - silver - Book Printer - 1998
- 500 schillings - silver - Goldsmith - 1998
- 500 schillings - silver - Rosenburg - 1999
- 500 schillings - silver - Lockenhaus - 1999
- 500 schillings - silver - Hochosterwitz - 2000
- 500 schillings - silver - Hohenwerfen - 2000
- 500 schillings - silver - Festung Kufstein - 2001
- 500 schillings - silver - Schattenburg - 2001
- 500 schillings - bi-metallic Au/Ag - Entry of Austria into the EU - 1995
- 500 schillings - gold - Don Giovanni - 1991
- 500 schillings - gold - Rudolf II, Holy Roman Emperor - 1993
- 500 schillings - gold - Franz Schubert - 1997
- 500 schillings - gold - Vienna Boys Choir - 1998
- 500 schillings - gold - Johann Strauss/Father & Son - 1999
- 500 schillings - gold - Birth of Christ - 2000
- 500 schillings - gold - The Bible - 2001

== 1000 schilling ==
- 1000 schillings - bi-metallic Ag/Au - 800 years Vienna Mint - 1994
- 1000 schillings - gold - The Magic Flute - 1991
- 1000 schillings - gold - Queen Marie Antoinette of France - 1997
- 1000 schillings - gold - Empress Elisabeth of Austria - 1998
- 1000 schillings - gold - Emperor Karl I of Austria - 1999
- 1000 schillings - gold - Heidentor - 2000
- 1000 schillings - gold - Illuminated manuscripts - 2001

== Euro ==
Austria changed to the euro in 2002, since then it has been minting several commemorative euro coins in silver and gold every year.
