= Staudinger =

Staudinger is a German surname. Notable people with the surname include:

- Alma Staudinger (1921–2017), Austrian diver
- Christina Staudinger (born 1987), Austrian freestyle skier
- Conny Staudinger (1927–2025), Austrian ice hockey player
- Hannes Staudinger (1907–1974), Austrian cinematographer
- Hans Staudinger (1889–1980), German politician
- Hermann Staudinger (1881–1965), German chemist who demonstrated the existence of macromolecules and was the winner of the 1953 Nobel Prize in Chemistry
- Josef Staudinger (1906–1998), Austrian diver who competed in the 1928 and 1932 Summer Olympics
- Magda Staudinger (1902–1997), Latvian biologist and botanist
- Magdalene Epply-Staudinger (1907–2005), Austrian diver
- Otto Staudinger (1830–1900), German entomologist
- Rupert Staudinger (born 1997), British-German luger
- Stella Staudinger (born 1972), Austrian basketball player
- Ursula Staudinger (born 1959), German psychologist
- Wolfgang Staudinger (born 1963), West German luger who competed from 1978 to 1989

== See also ==
- Staudinger synthesis, method to prepare β-lactams
- Staudinger reaction, chemical reaction in which the combination of an azide with a phosphine or phosphite produces an iminophosphorane intermediate
- Staudinger–Grumke House–Store, a historic home located in Augusta, Missouri
