= Covid-19 Commemorative Medal =

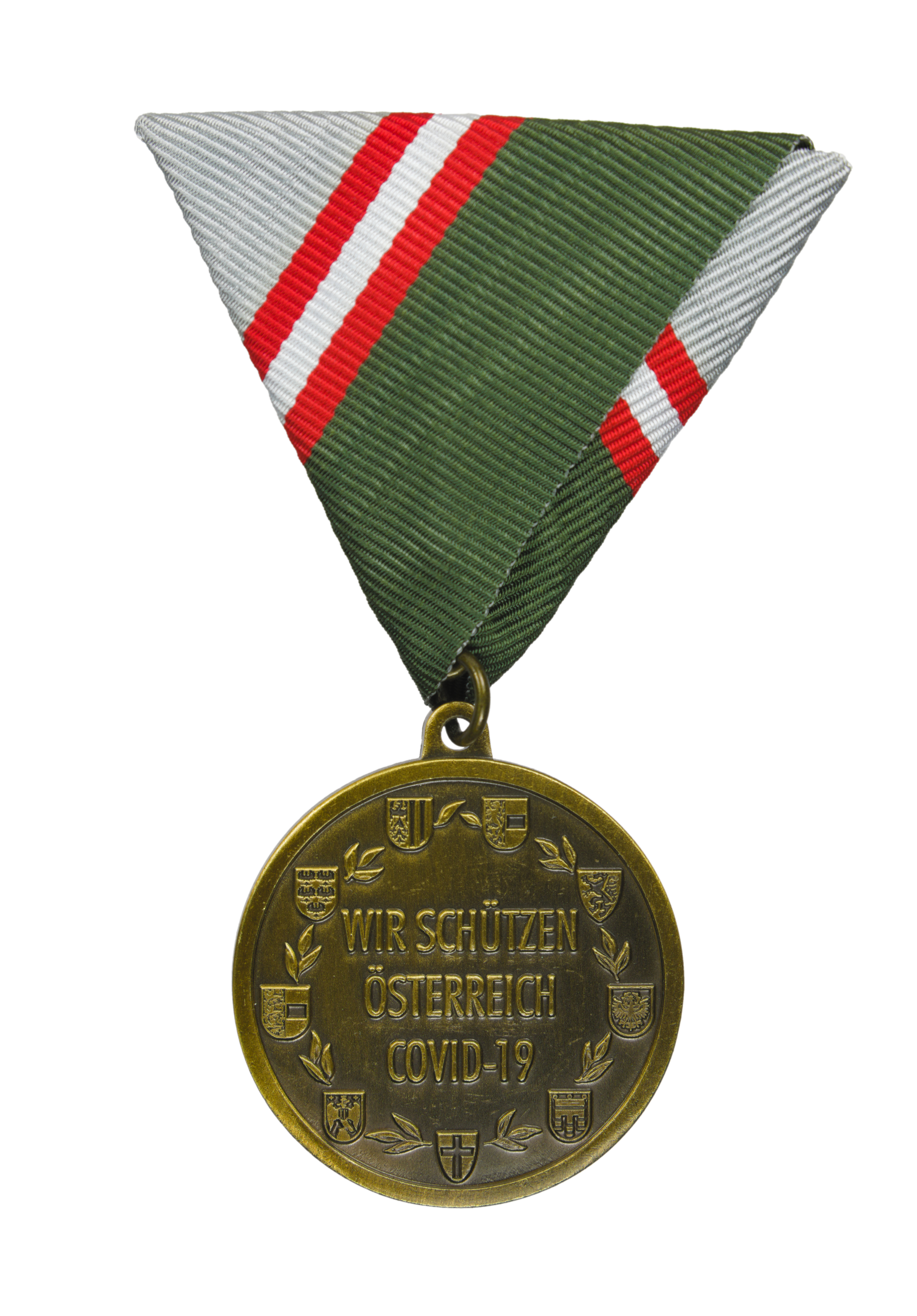
- Covid-19 Commemorative Medal
- Type: Medal
- Presented by: Austria
- Status: Active
- Established: July 1, 2020
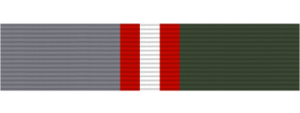
- Ribbon bar of the award

Precedence
- Next (higher): Militia Medal (Milizmedaille)
- Next (lower): N/A

The Covid-19 Commemorative Medal (German: COVID-19 Erinnerungsmedaille) is a state award of the Republic of Austria, established on July 1, 2020. The award is presented by the Federal Ministry of Defence to both soldier and civilian members of the Austrian Armed Forces. The medal recognizes those military service members who have supported operations in the fight against the COVID-19 pandemic.

== Criteria ==
The Covid-19 Commemorative Medal can be awarded to members of the Austrian Armed Forces who, following the first nationwide lockdown on March 16, 2020, over at least 3 days, and totaling at lead 24 hours, participated in the fight against the COVID-19 pandemic as part of a support service, or who have shown their commitment to Austria in further service. As of October 27, 2021, 10,380 personnel have been awarded the Covid-19 Commemorative Medal.

Qualifying activities have included serving as vaccine coordinators, working as biologists or paramedics on Covid-19 testing buses, and supporting contact tracing efforts. Participation in Covid-19 evacuation flights, and serving as security police assisting health administrators' inspections and activities are also qualifying activities.

== Insignia ==
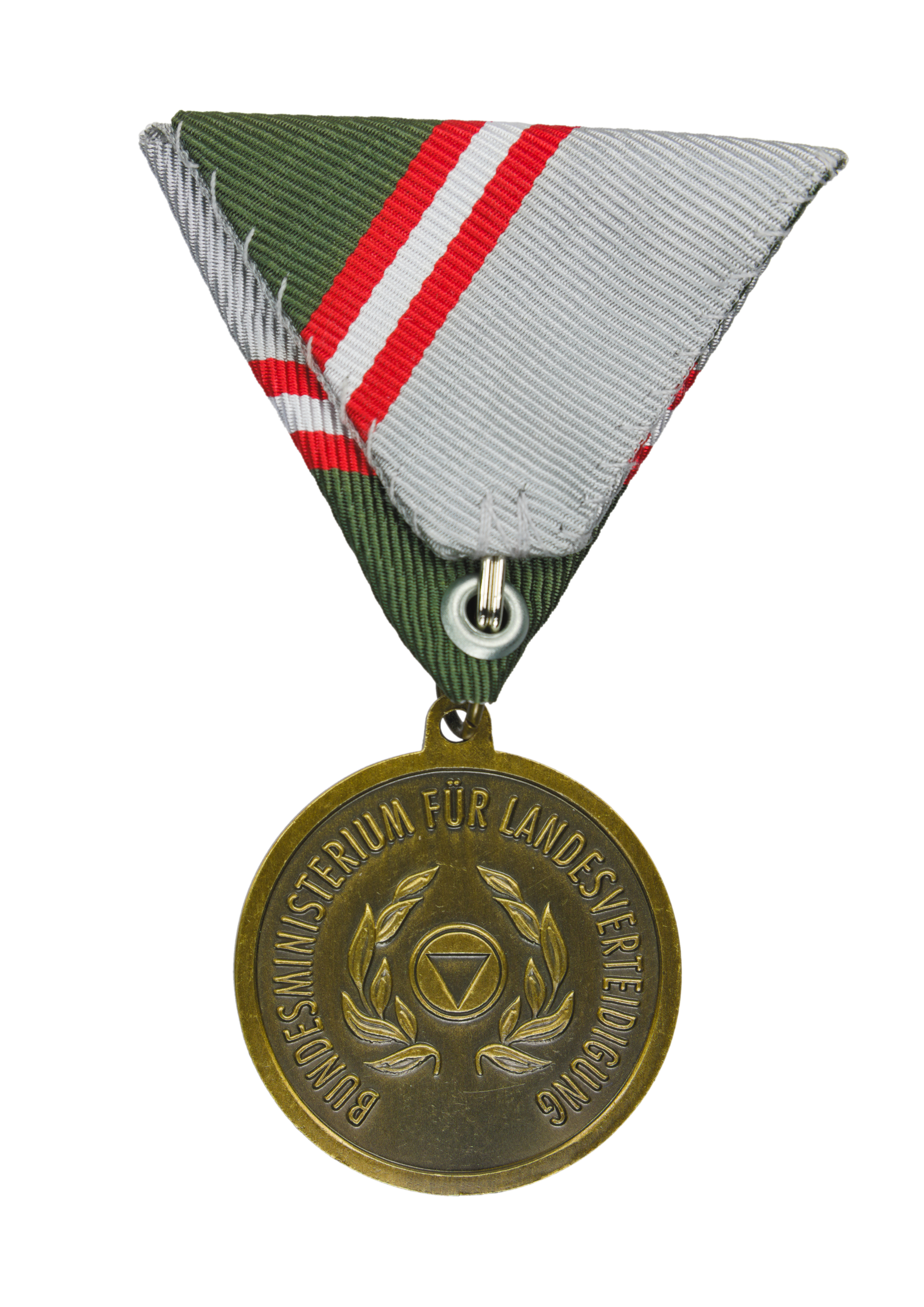
Back side of the commemorative medal

- The ribbon is made up of two thick stripes of agate grey and olive green, separated by a median red-white-red stripe. On the full-sized medal, the ribbon is arranged as an Austrian trifold, while on the miniature medals, it is arranged as a drape. The medal is a 35mm bronze circular medallion.
- The obverse of the medal reads "WIR SCHÜTZEN ÖSTERREICH - COVID-19" (English: WE PROTECT AUSTRIA - COVID-19) with the text encircled by a laurel wreath and the coats of arms of the nine federal states of Austria.
- The reverse of the medal features the roundel of the Austrian Armed Forces, encircled by a laurel wreath, and the phrase "BUNDESMINISTERIUM FÜR LANDESVERTEIDIGUNG" (English: FEDERAL MINISTRY OF DEFENCE).

== See also ==
- Honours system in Austria
- COVID-19 pandemic in Austria
- Impact of the COVID-19 pandemic on the military

Similar awards

- Public Health Service COVID-19 Pandemic Campaign Medal, United States
- COVID-19 Resilience Medal, Singapore
