= Orders, decorations, and medals of Austria =

The honours system in the Republic of Austria is a means of rewarding individuals' personal achievement, or service to Austria by state decorations and medals.

The system consists of several types of award which were established by the National Council and are conferred by the President of Austria in accordance with the respective laws.

== History ==
Decoration for Services to the Republic of Austria (typical form)

Over time, the National Council of Austria has enacted a series of laws establishing the various decorations and medals which now make up the Austrian honours system. Among these were

- in 1952, the "Decoration for Services to the Republic of Austria" (Ehrenzeichen für Verdienste um die Republik Österreich) – awarded in 15 classes.
- in 1955, the "Austrian Decoration for Science and Art" (Österreichisches Ehrenzeichen für Wissenschaft und Kunst) – awarded in 3 classes.
- in 1976, the "Decoration for Services to the Liberation of Austria" (Ehrenzeichen für Verdienste um die Befreiung Österreichs) – awarded in 1 class.
- in 1989, the "Military Merit Decoration" (Militärverdienstzeichen) – awarded in 1 class.

== Precedence ==
Note: this list is not complete

The order of precedence of the decorations and medals in the current Austrian honours system is:

- Decoration of Honour for Services to the Republic of Austria ( ... für Verdienste um die Republik Österreich)
  - Grand Star (Groß-Stern des Ehrenzeichens für Verdienste um die Republik Österreich).
  - Grand Decoration in Gold with Sash (Großes Goldenes Ehrenzeichen am Bande für ... ).
  - Grand Decoration in Silver with Sash (Großes Silbernes Ehrenzeichen am Bande für ... ).
  - Grand Decoration in Gold with Star (Großes Goldenes Ehrenzeichen mit Stern für ... ).
  - Grand Decoration in Silver with Star (Großes Silbernes Ehrenzeichen mit Stern für ... ).
- Austrian Decoration for Science and Art (Österreichisches Ehrenzeichen für Wissenschaft und Kunst).
- Decoration for Services to the Republic of Austria
  - Grand Decoration in Gold (Großes Goldenes Ehrenzeichen für ... ).
  - Grand Decoration in Silver (Großes Silbernes Ehrenzeichen für ... ).
- "Austrian Decoration for Military Merit" (Österreichisches Militärverdienstzeichen).
- Austrian Cross of Honour for Science and Art, First Class (Österreichisches Ehrenkreuz für Wissenschaft und Kunst, Erste Klasse).
- Decoration for Services to the Republic of Austria
  - Grand Decoration (Großes Ehrenzeichen für ... ).
- "Austrian Cross of Honour for Science and Art" (Österreichisches Ehrenkreuz für Wissenschaft und Kunst).
- Decoration for Services to the Republic of Austria
  - Gold Decoration (Goldenes Ehrenzeichen für ... ).
  - Silver Decoration (Silbernes Ehrenzeichen für ... ).
- Decoration for Services to Austria's Liberation (Ehrenzeichen für Verdienste um die Befreiung Österreichs).
- Merit Badge of the Republic of Austria (Verdienstzeichen der Republik Österreich)
  - Gold Merit Badge (Goldenes Verdienstzeichen ... ).
  - Silver Merit Badge (Silbernes Verdienstzeichen ... ).
- Medal for Services to the Republic of Austria (Medaille für Verdienste um die Republik Österreich)
  - Gold Medal (Goldene Medaille für ... ).
    - The "Gold Medal for Services to the Republic of Austria" may also be conferred as "Gold Medal with Red Riband" when awarded for bravery during an act of lifesaving.
  - Silver Medal (Silberne Medaille für ... ).
  - Bronze Medal (Bronzene Medaille für ... ), which is no longer awarded.
- Austrian Olympic Medal 1964 (Österreichische Olympiamedaille 1964)
- Austrian Olympic Medal 1976 (Österreichische Olympiamedaille 1976)
- Federal Honor Decoration (Bundes-Ehrenzeichen)
- Mine Rescue Medal (Grubenwehrehrenzeichen)
- Military Recognition Medal (Militär-Anerkennungs-medaille)
- Wound Medal (Austria) (Verwundetenmedaille)
  - Wound Medal for the Bundesheer, 1st class (Verwundetenmedaille 1. Klasse)
  - Wound Medal for Law Enforcement, 1st class (Verwundetenmedaille 1. Klasse der Exekutive)
  - Wound Medal for the Bundesheer, 2nd class (Verwundetenmedaille 2. Klasse)
  - Wound Medal for Law Enforcement, 2nd class (Verwundetenmedaille 2. Klasse der Exekutive)
- Austrian Armed Forces Operations Medal (Einsatzmedaille des Österreichischen Bundesheeres)
  - Austrian Armed Forces Operations Medal for Military Defence (Einsatzmedaille gem §2 Abs.1 lit. a WG militärische Landesverteidigung)
  - Austrian Armed Forces Operations Medal for Operations Abroad (Einsatzmedaille gem §2 Abs.1 lit. d WG Einsätze im Ausland)
  - Austrian Armed Forces Operations Medal for Public Order Operations (Einsatzmedaille gem §2 Abs.1 lit. b WG Einsätze im Inneren)
  - Austrian Armed Forces Operations Medal for Natural Disasters (Einsatzmedaille gem §2 Abs.1 lit. c WG Elemetarereignisse, etc)
- Law Enforcement Merit Decoration (Exekutivdienstzeichen)
- Military Service Award (Wehrdienstzeichen)
- Military Service Medal (Wehrdienstmedaille)
- Militia Medal (Milizmedaille)
- Covid-19 Commemorative Medal (Covid-Erinnerungsmedaille)
