= Austrian Armed Forces Operations Medal =

- Ribbon for defence operations Ribbon for operations abroad Ribbon for public order operations Ribbon for natural disasters
- Type: Military decoration
- Presented by: Austria
- Eligibility: Members of the Austrian Military
- Status: Currently Awarded
- First award: 2001

Precedence
- Next (higher): Wound Medal
- Next (lower): Law Enforcement Merit Decoration

The Austrian Armed Forces Operations Medal (German: Einsatzmedaille des Österreichischen Bundesheeres) was established in 2001 to recognize operational service by the Military of Austria. The medal is 40 mm wide and round, suspended from a ribbon that varies depending on the type of operation.

== Appearance ==
The medal is round, 40 mm (1.6 in) in diameter, and made of bronze. On the front of the medal in the center the inscription EINSATZ FÜR ÖSTERREICH surrounded by an open-topped laurel wreath. The back of the medal shows the Coat of arms of Austria surrounded by the inscription ÖSTERREICHISCHES BUNDESHEER. It is suspended from a triangular folded ribbon.

== See also ==
- Honours system in Austria
