= Bundeswappen =

Bundeswappen (German, 'Federal Coat of Arms') or Bundesadler ('Federal Eagle') may refer to:

- Coat of arms of Germany
- Coat of arms of Austria
