= Robert Kratky =

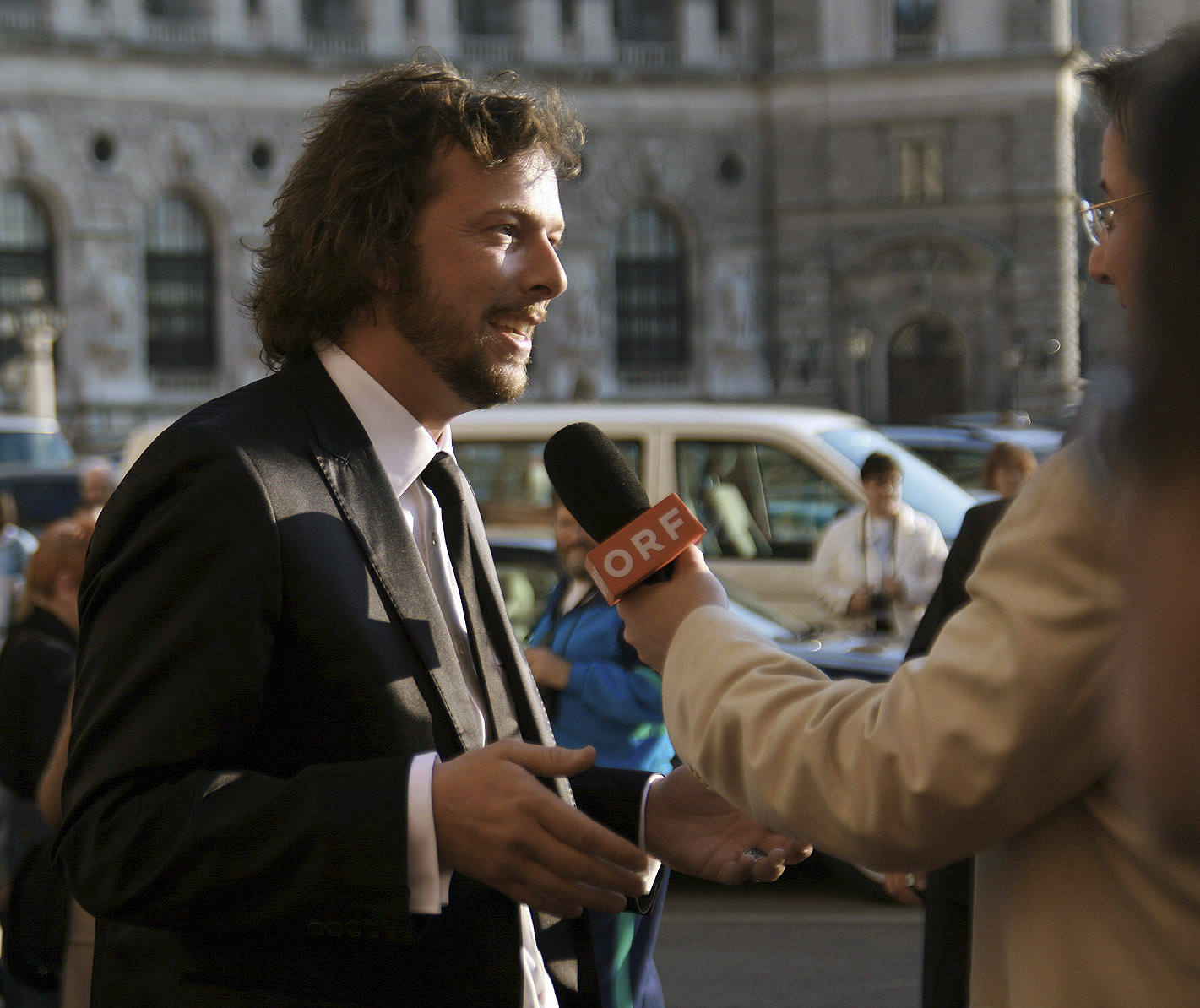
Robert Kratky at the Romy-Gala 2009

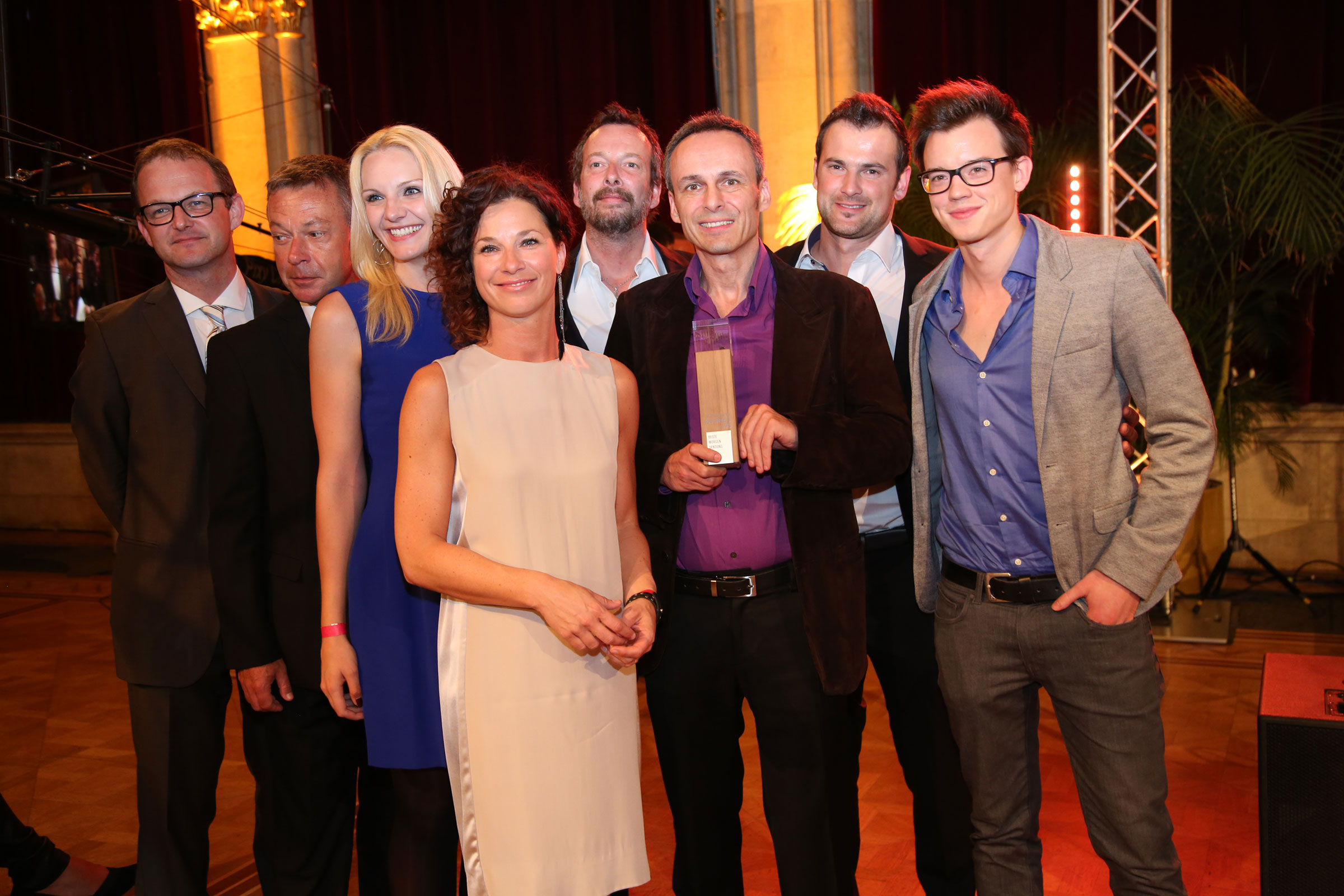
The Ö3-Wecker-team at the 2015 Austrian Radio Awards: Ö3-Wecker named Austria's best morning show; center, back: Robert Kratky, best radio presenter

Robert Werner Erik Kratky (born 16 May 1973 in Salzburg) is a former Austrian radio host.

== Career ==
=== Radio and Television ===
After dropping out of school, the winner of the Salzburg State Speech Competition began working at Radio Salzburg. After his first appearances as a presenter on the Ö3 youth magazine program ZickZack, he was discovered by the ORF radio station Ö3 and has been presenting the Ö3-Wecker program ever since, initially as a substitute for Hary Raithofer, and then taking over as the main presenter after Raithofer's departure. Before being appointed main presenter of the Ö3-Wecker, Kratky had been working as a head writer, producer, reporter, and designer since 1991, creating comedies such as "Vignettenman", "Mikromann" and "Oma Raithofer & Opa Kratky", which were broadcast for several years to great public acclaim and in some cases achieved cult status.

He hosted the adapted BBC television format Austria's Worst Drivers on ORF television, as well as the Austrian entries for the 2011 Song Contest in the final show Düsseldorf wir kommen! and the preliminary round for the 2012 Song Contest. From October to December 2011, Kratky hosted ten episodes of his weekly Friday evening personality talk show Kratky, broadcast on ORF eins. On 22 November 2013, he hosted the official year-in-review show 2013 Backstage, and in December 2014, he hosted the ORF year-in-review show, both on ORF eins.

From 19 to 24 December 2014, Kratky, together with Gabi Hiller and Andi Knoll, hosted the live broadcast of the Ö3-Weihnachtswunder (Ö3 Christmas Miracle) for the first time, presenting non-stop for a total of 5 days, or 120 hours, from a glass container called the Ö3-Wunschhütte on Salzburg's Kapitelplatz, in aid of "Licht ins Dunkel". Together with Gabi Hiller and Andi Knoll, he hosted the Ö3-Weihnachtswunder for ten consecutive years until 2023.

In addition to his work for ORF, Kratky has been and continues to be a spokesperson for various companies and their brands. In 2007, he co-authored the book Die ganze Wahrheit (...), which topped the non-fiction bestseller list for several weeks, with his Ö3 colleague Daniela Zeller.

According to various surveys conducted by TV-Media, Seitenblicke Magazin, Heute, and others, Kratky was Austria's most popular radio presenter. In 2015, he won the Austrian Radio Award for best presenter.

Since fall 2017, Kratky has also been the star of the short video series Tagwache mit Kratky (Reveille with Kratky), produced by the Austrian Armed Forces.

In May 2023, he announced that he would not be renewing his contract with Ö3, but would be leaving ORF when his contract expired at the end of 2026.

In 2024, he appeared in the music video for the single Nebel by Austrian supergroup AUT of ORDA.

In 2024, it was revealed that Kratky was the highest-paid ORF employee in 2023 with an annual salary of €443,000. In 2024, he was once again the highest-paid employee at ORF with an annual salary of just under €472,000.

In August 2025, Kratky announced his early retirement from ORF, citing health reasons for his decision. Two weeks earlier, on 1 August 2025, he hosted his last Ö3-Wecker show. Negative public reactions to Kratky's salary over the past two years are also said to have played a role in his early retirement.

== Accolades ==
On 22 February 2021, he received the Military Recognition Medal from Federal Minister of Defense Klaudia Tanner for his achievements in public relations, particularly for the creation of videos.

== Personal life ==
Robert Kratky grew up in Salzburg-Riedenburg and now lives in Stein an der Donau. He has a sister, Inge, and a brother, Thomas.

== Works ==
- with Daniela Zeller: Die ganze Wahrheit über… Treue, Zeit, Sex, Schuhe, Frauen über 30, Geld & Karriere, Idealgewicht und: den Sinn des Lebens. Ecowin Verlag, Vienna 2007, ISBN 978-3-902404-43-5.
