= Military Merit Decoration =

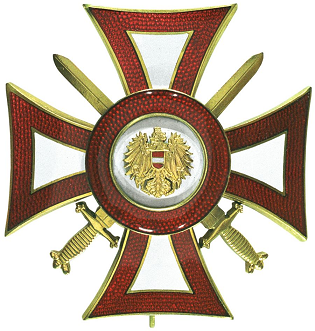
- Cross of the decoration
- Type: Military decoration
- Presented by: Austria
- Eligibility: Members of the Austrian Military
- Status: Currently Awarded
- Established: 13 November 1989

Precedence
- Next (higher): Grand Decoration of Honour in Silver for Services to the Republic of Austria
- Next (lower): Austrian Cross of Honour for Science and Art, 1st Class

The Austrian Military Merit Decoration (German: Militärverdienstzeichen) was established 13 November 1989 to honor the Military of Austria. The badge is a silver-gilt breast star which is worn on the left chest. The cross is 60 mm wide and high and in white enamel, with a red border. In the center is a gold medallion with the Austrian eagle. The cross has no inscription on the obverse, but on the reverse is inscribed Verdienst (Military Merit). Between the arms of the cross are gold crossed swords.

== See also ==
- Honours system in the Republic of Austria
