= Liechtenstein franc =

Currency of Liechtenstein

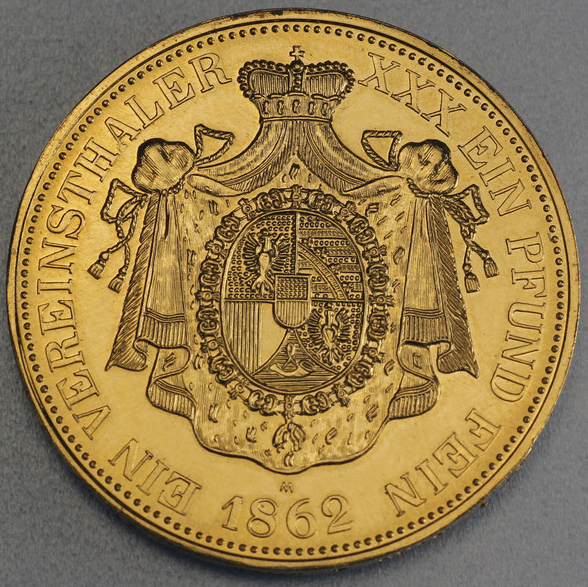
Liechtenstein Vereinsthaler, 1862

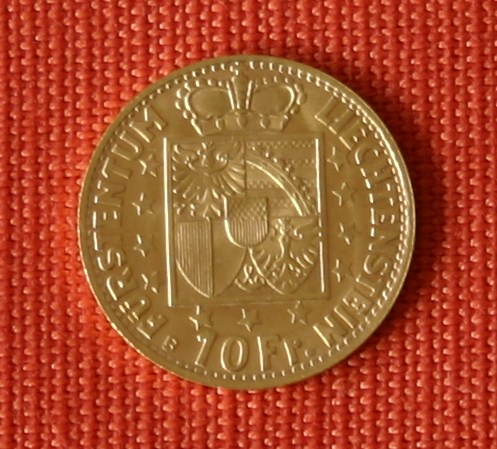
10 Liechtenstein franc gold coin from 1946, 2.90 g fine gold, minted according to the Latin Monetary Union standard

The Swiss franc (plural: francs; in German: Frank, plural: Franken) has been the currency of Liechtenstein since 1920. The Swiss franc is legal tender since Liechtenstein is in a customs and monetary union with Switzerland. The 1980 treaty between Switzerland and Liechtenstein allows Liechtenstein to mint limited amounts of Swiss francs with a Liechtenstein inscription, but only in the form of commemorative coins (mainly issued for collectors), and they are not allowed to issue banknotes.

Liechtenstein used the Austro-Hungarian and then Austrian krone and heller (and also the Liechtenstein krone) until 1920, and switched to the Swiss franc due to the krone's instability following the First World War. Liechtenstein coins are so rare that they do not actually circulate, and no banknotes have been issued, with the exception of three emergency issues of heller in 1920. Most of the Liechtenstein franc coins have the same amount of precious metal as the Swiss franc, except for the coins minted in the late 1980s and 1990s.

The highest number of Liechtenstein franc coins minted was the 1 franc minted in 1924; 60,000 were struck, but 45,355 of them were later melted. If the number of melted coins is excluded, the highest mintage would be the 50 franc piece minted in 1988 commemorating the 50th anniversary of the reign of Prince Franz Joseph II and the 10 franc piece minted in 1990 commemorating the succession of Prince Hans-Adam II. Both number 35,000.

== History of early currencies used in Liechtenstein ==
The following denominations were issued

- 1728: 20 kreutzer, 1/2 thaler, 1 thaler, 1 ducat and 10 ducats
- 1758: 1/2 thaler, 1 thaler and 1 ducat
- 1778: 1/2 thaler, 1 thaler and 1 ducat

The ducats were in minted in 986 gold, and all other coins were minted in 583 silver. All coins bore on the obverse side the right-facing bust of each prince and on the reverse side his arms.

In 1862, under Prince Johann II, another coin was minted, a vereinsthaler, which had the same design as the previous coins and was taken out of circulation in 1893, with a value of 3.53 crowns. There was a currency reform on 26 August 1898. 1 florin (German: gulden) now had the value of a Liechtenstein crown (Liechtenstein krone) and there were 100 hellers in a crown. Under Johann II, silver coins were issued with denominations of 1 crown, 2 crowns and 5 crowns. Coins with denominations of 10 crowns and 20 crowns were minted in gold. Unlike the previous coins, the obverse side depicted the left-facing bust of the prince. These coins were taken out of circulation on 28 August 1920.

== History of the Liechtenstein franc ==
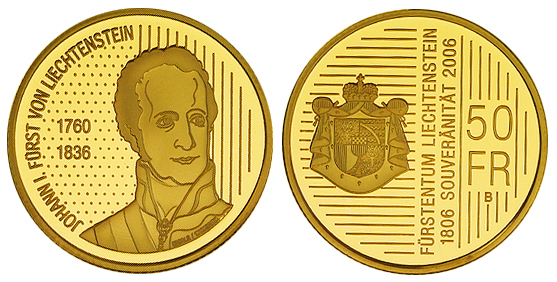
50 Liechtenstein franc coin, gold, 2006

On 26 May 1924, there was another currency reform, the new currency had 100 rappens to the franc. This currency is still the official currency of Liechtenstein today. Prince Johann II had silver coins minted with denominations of 1/2 franc, 1 franc, 2 francs and 5 francs. When Franz I came to power, he did not have any more of these denominations minted, because there were enough of his predecessor's silver coins in circulation. During his rule, gold coins with denominations of 10 francs and 20 francs were minted in 1930. They depict on the obverse side the bust of the prince, now facing to the right again.

From then on, Liechtenstein francs were minted only for collection purposes, since the Swiss franc had become the main currency of Liechtenstein. In 1946 Prince Franz Josef II had two denominations of coins minted, with face values of 10 francs and 20 francs; and ten years later gold coins with face values of 25 francs, 50 francs and 100 francs. The obverse of these coins, for the first time, depicts a Liechtenstein prince with his wife. The hundredth anniversary of the National bank of Liechtenstein in 1961 was celebrated by the minting of two gold coins with a face value 25 francs and 50 francs. For Franz Josef's golden jubilee in 1988, a special commemorative 10 franc silver coin and a 50 franc gold coin were minted. In 1990, Hans Adam II had a 10 franc silver coin and a 50 franc gold coin minted to celebrate the ceremony of Homage (German: Erbhuldigung), marking the transfer of power to the new prince. In 2006, two coin designs with the same face value were issued in celebration of the 200-year anniversary of the sovereignty of the Principality of Liechtenstein. In 2019, a set of four coins, in denominations of 5, 10, 25 and 100 francs, were issued in celebration of the 300th anniversary of the sovereignty of the Principality of Liechtenstein.

Preceded by: Austrian krone and Liechtenstein krone Reason: Austrian krone was unstable	Currency of Liechtenstein; 1920 – Concurrent with: Swiss franc	Succeeded by: Current
