= COVID-19 Resilience Medal =

Singaporean State award

COVID-19 Resilience Medal (CRM)
- Type: Medal
- Awarded for: Service to the national fight against COVID-19 pandemic
- Presented by: Singapore
- Eligibility: Any person employed by, or associated with, government service
- Status: Inactive
- Established: 2022
- First award: 2023
- Ribbon

The COVID-19 Resilience Medal (CRM) is a special Singaporean State Award awarded to those who participated directly in the national fight against COVID-19 pandemic.

== History ==
The CRM was established in 2022 to honour substantive contributions of those who participated directly in the fight against COVID-19.

In December 2023, The Straits Times reported that the CRM was being sold on online marketplace with at least six listings. Later that month, an anonymous group of healthcare workers wrote an open letter to the Ministry of Health and Health Minister Ong Ye Kung stating that many healthcare workers who contributed to the fight against COVID-19. The Ministry of Health replied that there was no quotas on medals being issued and had been as inclusive as possible. After the initial list was published in May 2023, more awardees were included by mid August. More than 110,000 people have been awarded the medals.

During Parliament in 2024, Ong addressed that 91 per cent of Singapore's public healthcare workers were conferred the COVID-19 Resilience Medal. Ong also said that the remaining did not receive the award due to failure to contribute significantly towards the pandemic or disqualified due to their disciplinary records. It was also possible that employers might have missed nominating their staff.

== Criteria ==
Public healthcare workers made substantial contributions to:

- Managing the public health crisis at the frontlines
- Supporting frontline operations, such as vaccination, testing, managing dorms or recovery facilities
- Managing the consequences of COVID-19 on Singapore’s economy, supply chains or social cohesion

== Description ==
- The medal, in silver, is encircled with its name, ‘COVID-19 Resilience Medal’. A shield with five stars and a crescent moon forms the centrepiece of the medal, representing Singapore as a young nation and our ideals of democracy, peace, progress, justice and equality.
- The obverse carries the State Crest and engraved with the phrase: "SG United • Stronger Together".
- The ribbon is green with a single red stripe on a white base in the middle.

== National Awards (COVID-19) ==
In addition to the CRM, several existing state awards have been adapted to reflect contributions during the COVID-19 pandemic. These include the Commendation Medal, the Public Service Medal, and the Public Administration Medal. They all share the same ribbon as the COVID-19 Resilience Medal (CRM). These state awards (in order of precedence) are:

- Pingat Jasa Gemilang (COVID-19) – Meritorious Service Medal (COVID-19)
- Bintang Bakti Masyarakat (COVID-19) – Public Service Star (COVID-19)
- Pingat Pentadbiran Awam, Emas (COVID-19) – Public Administration Medal (Gold) (COVID-19)
- Pingat Keberanian (COVID-19) – Medal of Valour (COVID-19)
- Pingat Pentadbiran Awam, Perak (COVID-19) – Public Administration Medal (Silver) (COVID-19)
- Pingat Pentadbiran Awam, Gangsa (COVID-19) – Public Administration Medal (Bronze) (COVID-19)
- Pingat Kepujian (COVID-19) – Commendation Medal (COVID-19)
- Pingat Bakti Masyarakat (COVID-19) – Public Service Medal (COVID-19)
- Sijil Kepujian Presiden (COVID-19) – President's Certificate of Commendation (COVID-19)

== See also ==
- Public Health Service COVID-19 Pandemic Campaign Medal, United States
- Covid-19 Commemorative Medal, Austria
