= Military Service Medal =

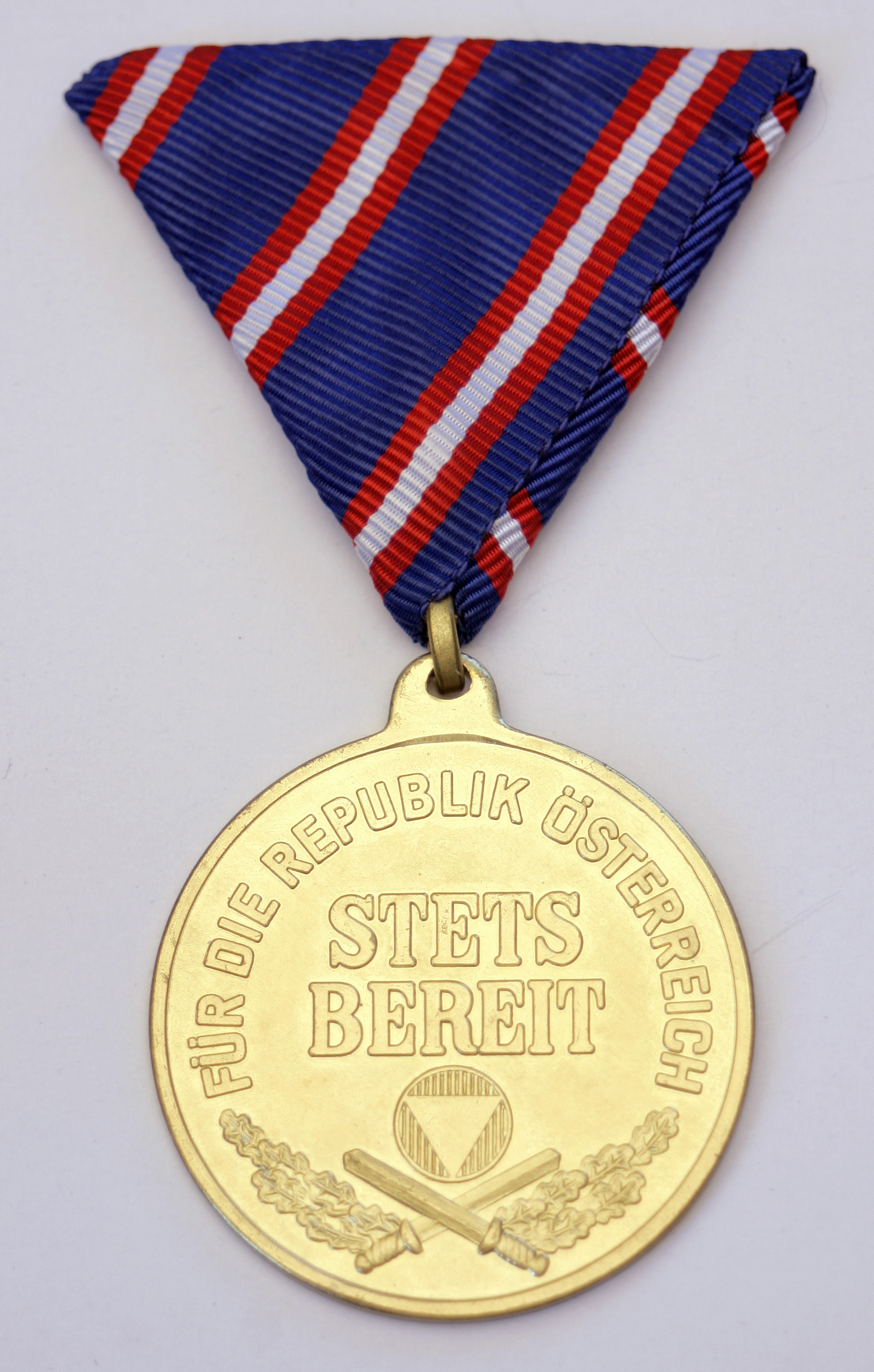
- Obverse of the Gold Military Service Medal
- Type: Military medal
- Awarded for: Designated lengths of service
- Presented by: Austria
- Eligibility: Members of the Austrian Military
- Status: Currently awarded
- Established: 10 July 1963
- Gold Military Service Medal Silver Military Service Medal Bronze Military Service Medal

Precedence
- Next (higher): Military Service Award (Wehrdienstzeichen)
- Next (lower): Militia Medal (Milizmedaille)

The Military Service Medal German: Wehrdienstmedaille is a military medal awarded to members of the Military of Austria. It is awarded in three classes: gold, silver, and bronze depending on length of recognized service. Established in 1963, the medal was originally called the Military Commemorative Service Medal (Wehrdiensterinnerungsmedaille). The name was changed to its current name in 1989.

== Criteria ==
The Military Service Medal in bronze is the most common award of the medal. It is awarded to conscripts at the end of their mandatory training. The silver medal is awarded to those members of the militia who have already earned the bronze medal and have performed at least 30 days of additional training or other militia duty. The gold medal is awarded to those already holding the silver medal who have performed an additional 60 days of training or other militia duty. The medals are awarded only once.

In the order of wear for Austrian medals the Military Service Medal is worn in order of gold, then silver, and finally bronze. They are worn before the Militia Medal and after the Military Service Award.

== Appearance ==
The medal is round, 40 mm (1.6 in), and made of bronze which is either plated in gold or silver depending on the grade. The obverse of the medal bears the inscription STETS BEREIT FÜR DIE REPUBLIK ÖSTERREICH (Always ready for the Republic of Austria) on the upper half of the medal. In the lower half is roundel of the Military of Austria surmounting crossed swords surrounded by an oak leaves. The reverse of the medal bears the Coat of arms of Austria. The medal is suspended from a triangular folded ribbon.
