= Bummerlhaus =

Coordinates: 48°02′20″N 14°25′10″E

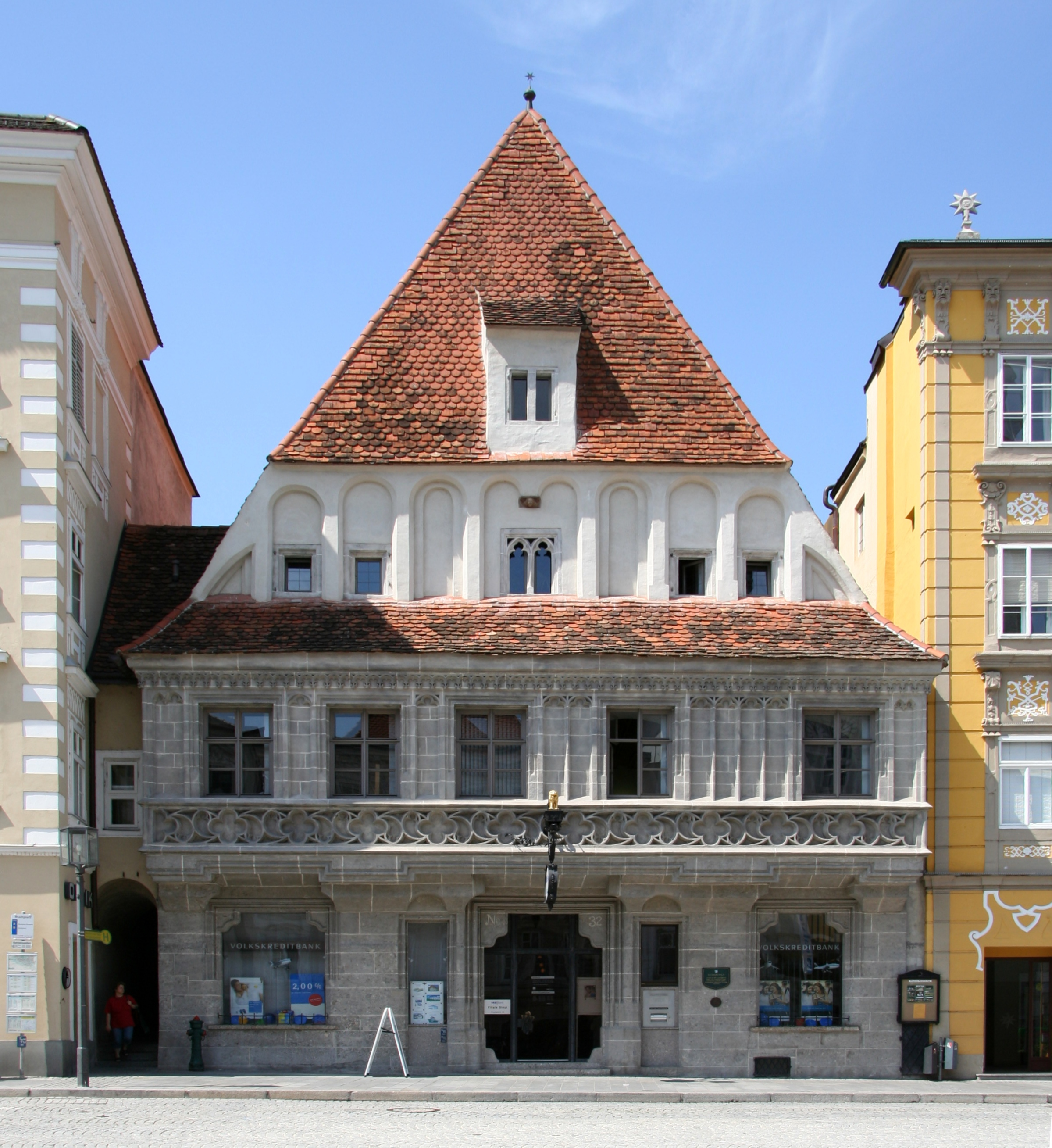
Bummerlhaus in Steyr

The Bummerlhaus is a gothic building in Steyr, Austria. It is the best preserved late Gothic mansion in Steyr, and is one of the finest medieval secular buildings in Austria. The oldest part of the building dates from the thirteenth century, and it is first mentioned in documents dating from 1450.

The house is a typical Steyr design, consisting of a richly decorated façade facing the square, behind which lies the house and three courtyards with arcades. It has a steep hipped roof. The façade facing the square on the first floor has a cantilevered, stone carved, wide bay window, which spans the entire elevation, adorned with blind arcades and a rich frieze with quatrefoil tracery, among which the five windows are placed asymmetrically. Above the narrow roof of the wide bay window rises a brick gable wall with blind arches of brick.

The name originates from when the building, in the 19th century, housed the Zum Goldenen Löwen ("At the Sign of the Golden Lion") inn. The lion on the signboard for the inn, according to the locals, looked like a dog, Bummerl meaning "little plump dog", and haus, meaning house.

Since 1923 the building has housed a branch of the VKB bank.

In 1973 the building was featured on the 50 schilling commemorative coin.
