= Liechtenstein krone =

Former currency of Liechtenstein

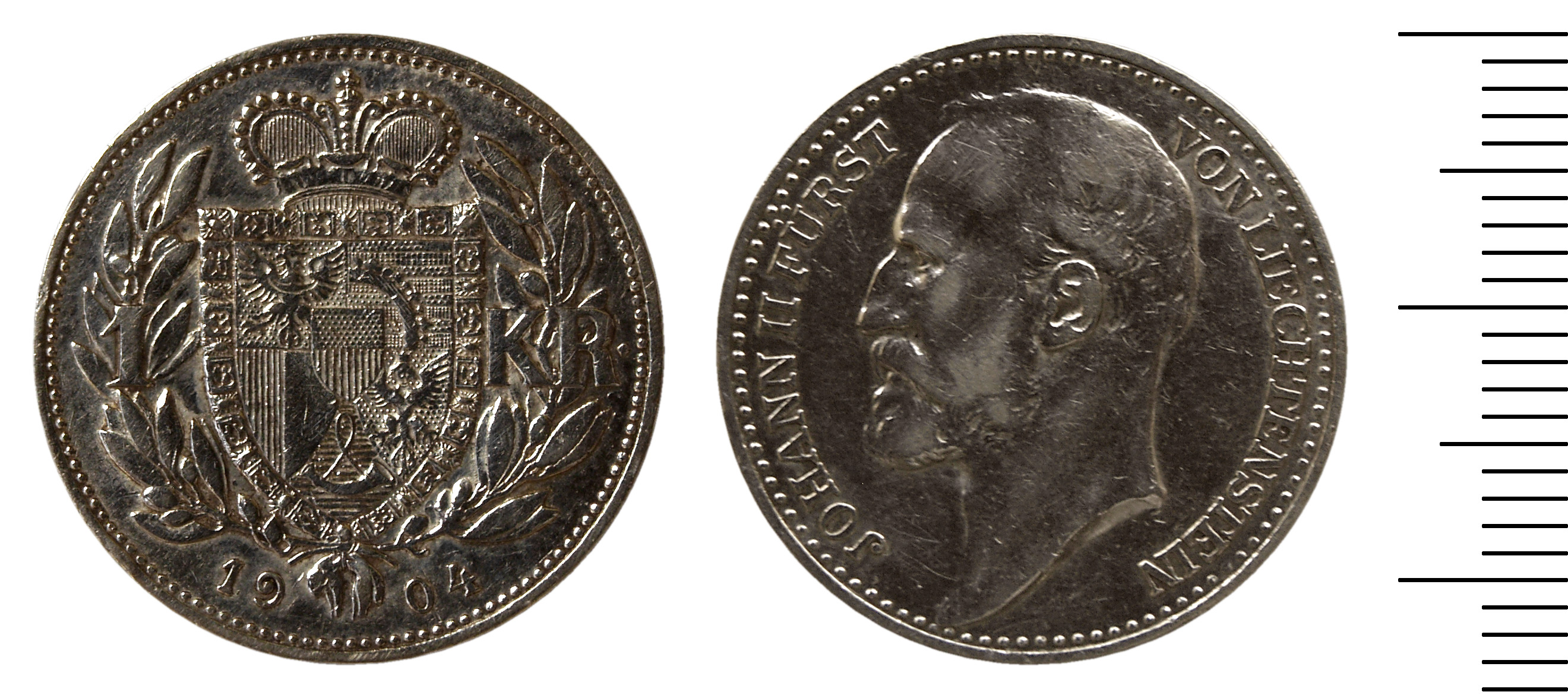
Silver 1 krone (1904)

The Liechtenstein krone (German Liechtenstein Krone, plural Kronen) was the currency of Liechtenstein from 1898 to 1921. The coins are rare, although the banknotes are somewhat more common. The krone was divided into 100 heller. Liechtenstein used the Austro-Hungarian krone and Austrian krone after the dissolution of the Austro-Hungarian Empire in 1918, and then switched to the Swiss franc in 1921 due to krone's instability. The Liechtenstein krone had the same amount of precious metal as the Austro-Hungarian krone or the Austrian krone. Coins came in values of 1, 2, 5, 10, 20 kronen. In 1920, small-change notes denominated in 10, 20, and 50 heller were issued as an emergency measure to supplement the coins then available.

Preceded by: Austro-Hungarian krone Ratio: at par	Currency of Liechtenstein; 1898 – 1921; Concurrent with: Austro-Hungarian krone before 1918 and Austrian krone after	Succeeded by: Swiss franc and Liechtenstein frank Reason: Austrian krone was unstable
