= Militia Medal =

Austrian military award

- Obverse of the Militia Medal (Austrian Armed Forces Photograph)
- Type: Military medal
- Awarded for: Services rendered in militia activities
- Presented by: Austria
- Eligibility: Members of the Austrian Militia
- Status: Currently awarded
- Established: 2006
- Ribbon bar of the medal

Precedence
- Next (higher): Bronze Military Service Medal (Wehrdienstmedaille)
- Next (lower): Awards of the States of Austria

The Militia Medal (German: Milizmedaille) is a military medal of Austria awarded to members of the militia in recognition of services rendered in militia activities. It can only be awarded once.

== Criteria ==
The Militia Medal is awarded to members of the militia who have completed 30 days of voluntary militia service. It may also be awarded to those members of the militia at the termination of their militia commitment.

The Militia Medal is worn after the Bronze Military Service Medal, but before the awards of the States of Austria

== Appearance ==
The Militia Medal is a 40 mm (1.6 in) circular bronze medal with a patinaed finish. It has a raised edge and an eyelet at the top for suspension. The obverse bears the words DER MILIZ (The Militia) in the center with the roundel of Austria flanked by oak leaves at the best. The reverse bears the Coat of arms of Austria surrounded by the inscription Bundesministerium für Landesverteidigung (Ministry of Defence). The medal is suspended from a triangle ribbon of pine green (RAL 6028) and thin white edge stripes.
