= Military Recognition Medal =

Austrian Armed Forces military decoration

Military Recognition Medal Militär-Anerkennungsmedaille
- Ribbon of the medal
- Type: Military decoration
- Awarded for: Special service to the Austrian Armed Forces
- Country: Austria
- Presented by: the Minister of Defense
- Eligibility: Civilians and members of the military
- Status: Currently awarded
- Established: 2006

Order of wear
- Next (higher): Mine Rescue Decoration
- Next (lower): Wound Medal

The Military Recognition Medal (German: Militär-Anerkennungsmedaille) is a military decoration of the Republic of Austria. Established in 2006, the medal may be awarded to members of the military or civilians for service to the Austrian Armed Forces.

== See also ==
- Honours system in Austria
