= Stella Staudinger =

Austrian basketball player

Stella Elfriede Staudinger
Personal information
- Born: 26 October 1972 (age 54) Steyr, Austria
- Listed height: 1.70 m (5 ft 7 in)

Career information
- Playing career: –2005
- Position: Point guard

Career history
- ASKÖ BSG
- Gustino Schnitzelpl
- UBBC Kresto
- BK Klosterneuburg
- 2003–2004: Ares Ribera
- 2004: Polisportiva Ares Ribera
- 2005: Norrköping Dolphins

Stella Elfriede Staudinger (born 26 October 1972) is an Austrian former professional basketball player.
