= Steyr =

Steyr Steia
- Statutory city
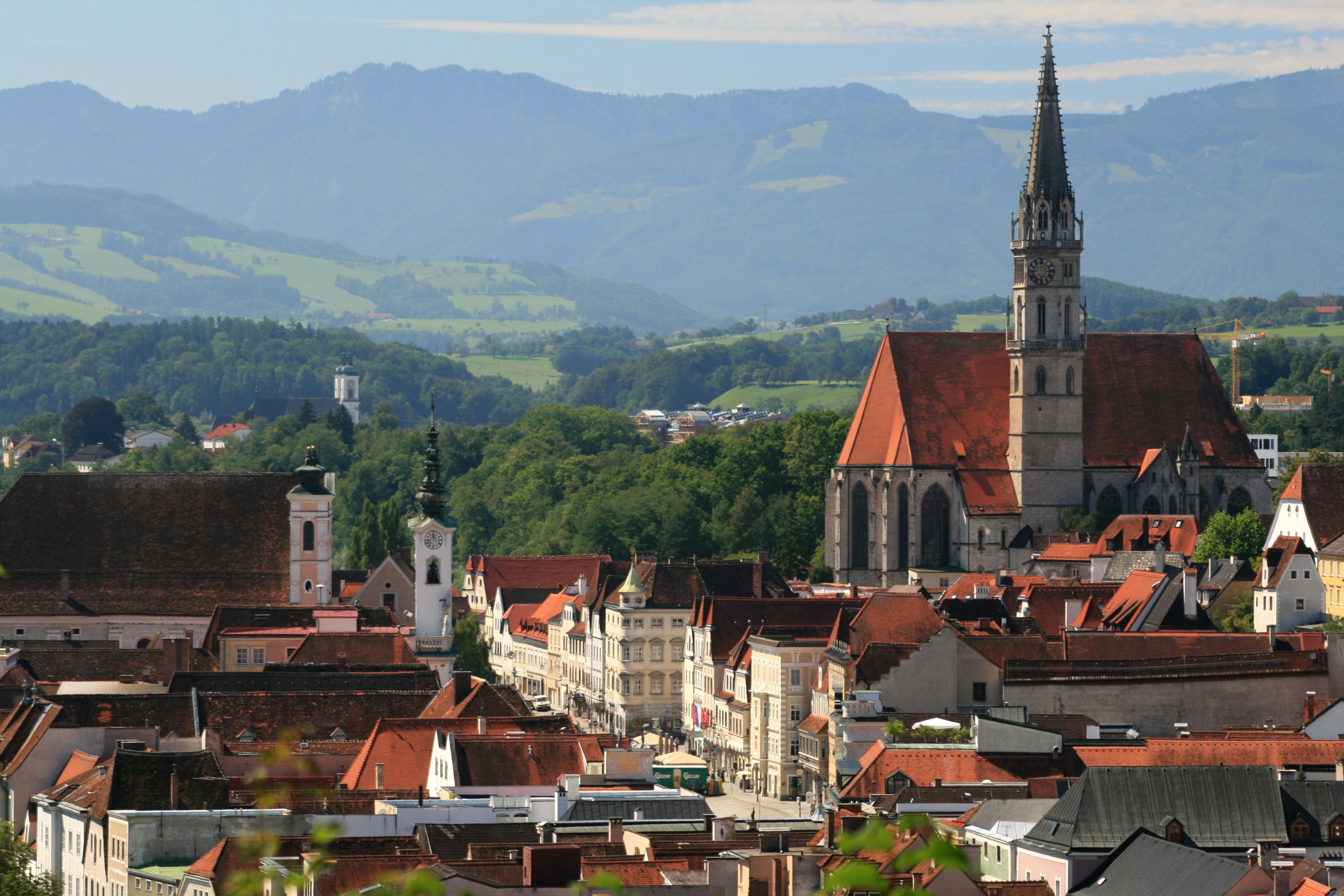
- View over the Old Town with city hall and parish church

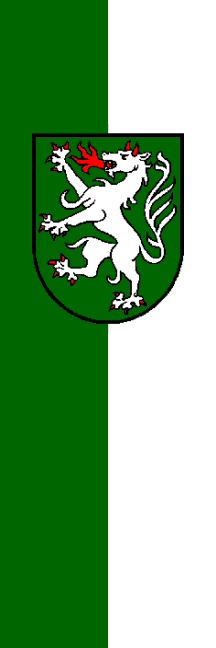
- Flag Coat of arms

- Location within Austria Steyr (Austria)
- Coordinates: 48°02′N 14°25′E
- Country: Austria
- State: Upper Austria
- District: Statutory city

Government
  - Mayor: Markus Vogl (SPÖ)

Area
  - Total: 26.56 km^{2} (10.25 sq mi)
- Elevation: 310 m (1,020 ft)

Population (2018-01-01)
  - Total: 38,331
  - Density: 1,443/km^{2} (3,738/sq mi)
- Time zone: UTC+1 (CET)
  - Summer (DST): UTC+2 (CEST)
- Postal code: 4400
- Area code: 07252
- Vehicle registration: SR
- Website: www.steyr.at

Steyr (German: [ˈʃtaɪɐ]; Central Bavarian: Steia) is a statutory city, located in the Austrian state of Upper Austria. It is the administrative capital, though not part of Steyr-Land District. Steyr is Austria's twelfth-most-populated town and the third-largest city in Upper Austria.

The city has a long history as a manufacturing center and has given its name to several manufacturers headquartered there, such as the former Steyr-Daimler-Puch conglomerate and its successor Steyr Motors.

== Geography ==
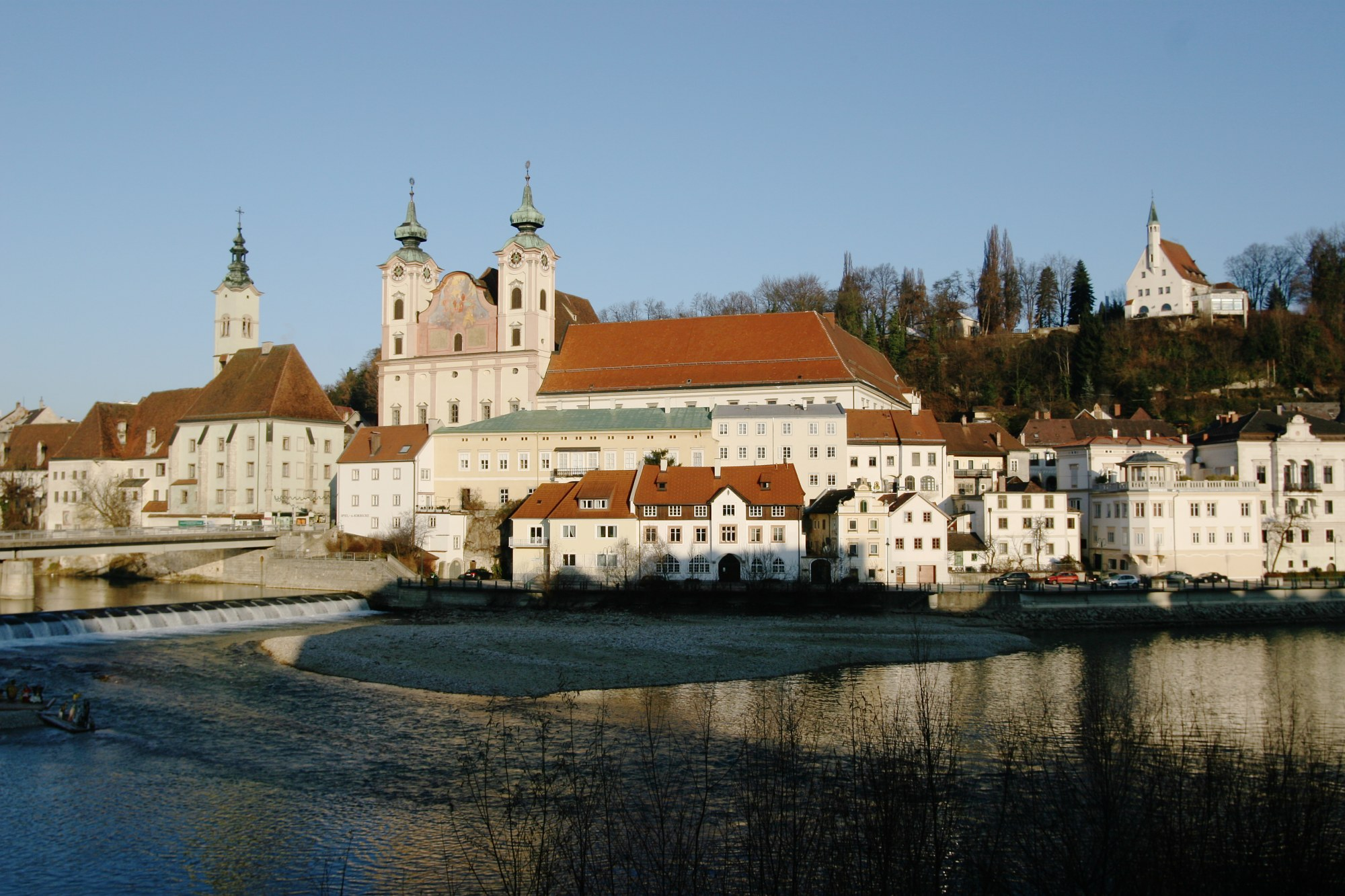
Saint Michael's Church, at the confluence of the Enns and Steyr rivers

The city is situated in the Traunviertel region, with the two rivers Steyr and Enns flowing through it and meeting near the town centre beneath Lamberg Castle and St Michael's Church. This prominent location has made it prone to severe flooding through the centuries until the present, one of the worst cases being recently in August 2002. To the south of the town rises a series of hills that climb in altitude and stretch out to the Upper Austrian Prealps. To the north, the hills roll downward towards the confluence of the Enns with the Danube River, where the town of Enns is situated. In the east, the municipal area borders with Lower Austria.

Steyr is an ancient town with modern amenities, marketing its rich cultural and architectural heritage in tourism like Vienna and many other well preserved Austrian historic towns. It marked its 1,000th anniversary in 1980, after undergoing extensive restoration of its historic architecture which has made it one of the best preserved old towns in the country. The famous historic town centre built around the Stadtplatz (town square) was largely restored following World War II. Its best-known piece of architecture is called the Bummerlhaus which is considered one of the finest examples of Gothic architecture for its size in Central Europe.

The city comprises the cadastral communities of Christkindl, Föhrenschacherl, Gleink, Hinterberg, Jägerberg, Sarning, Stein and Steyr.

== History ==
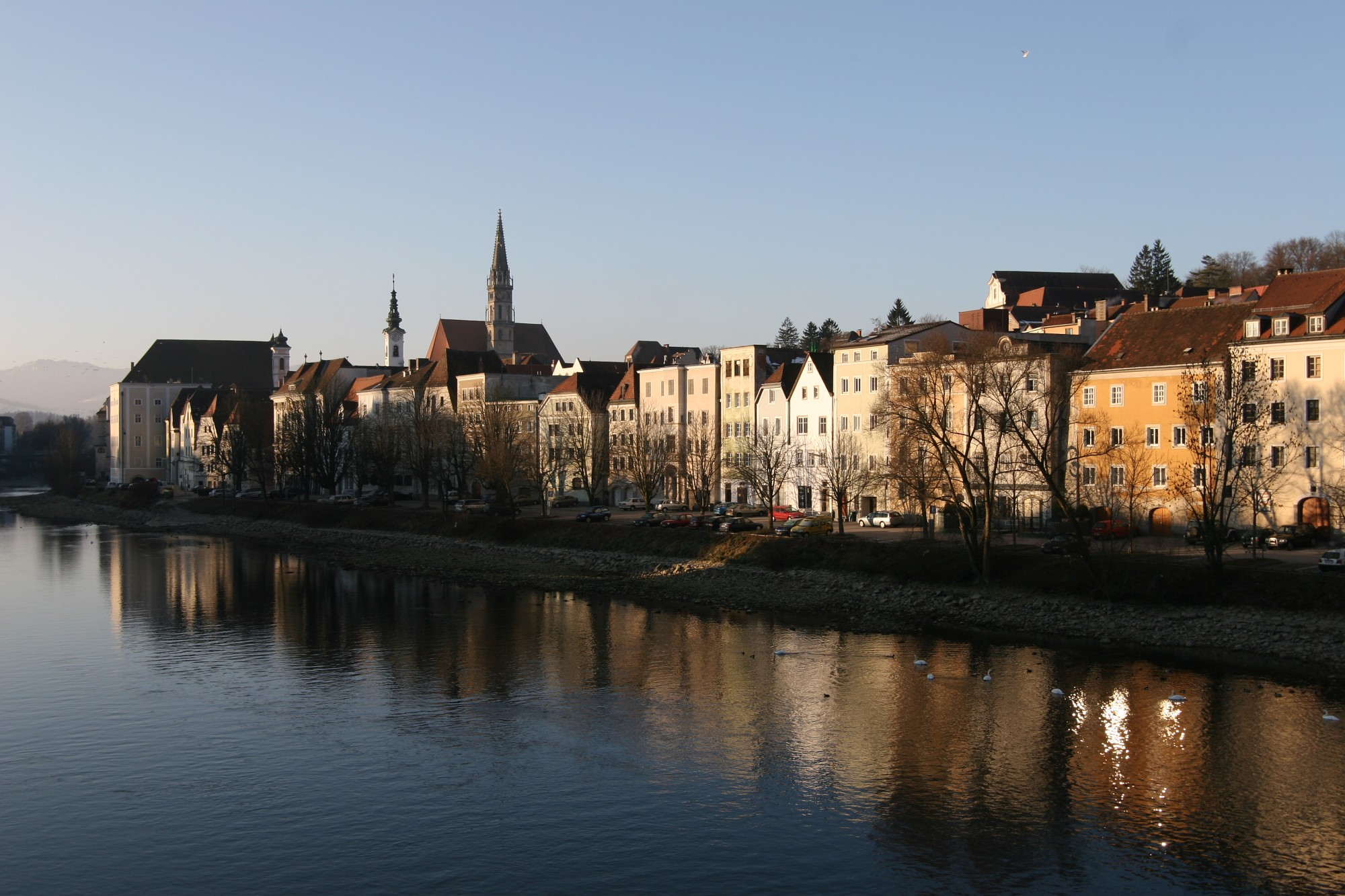
Quayside at Enns river

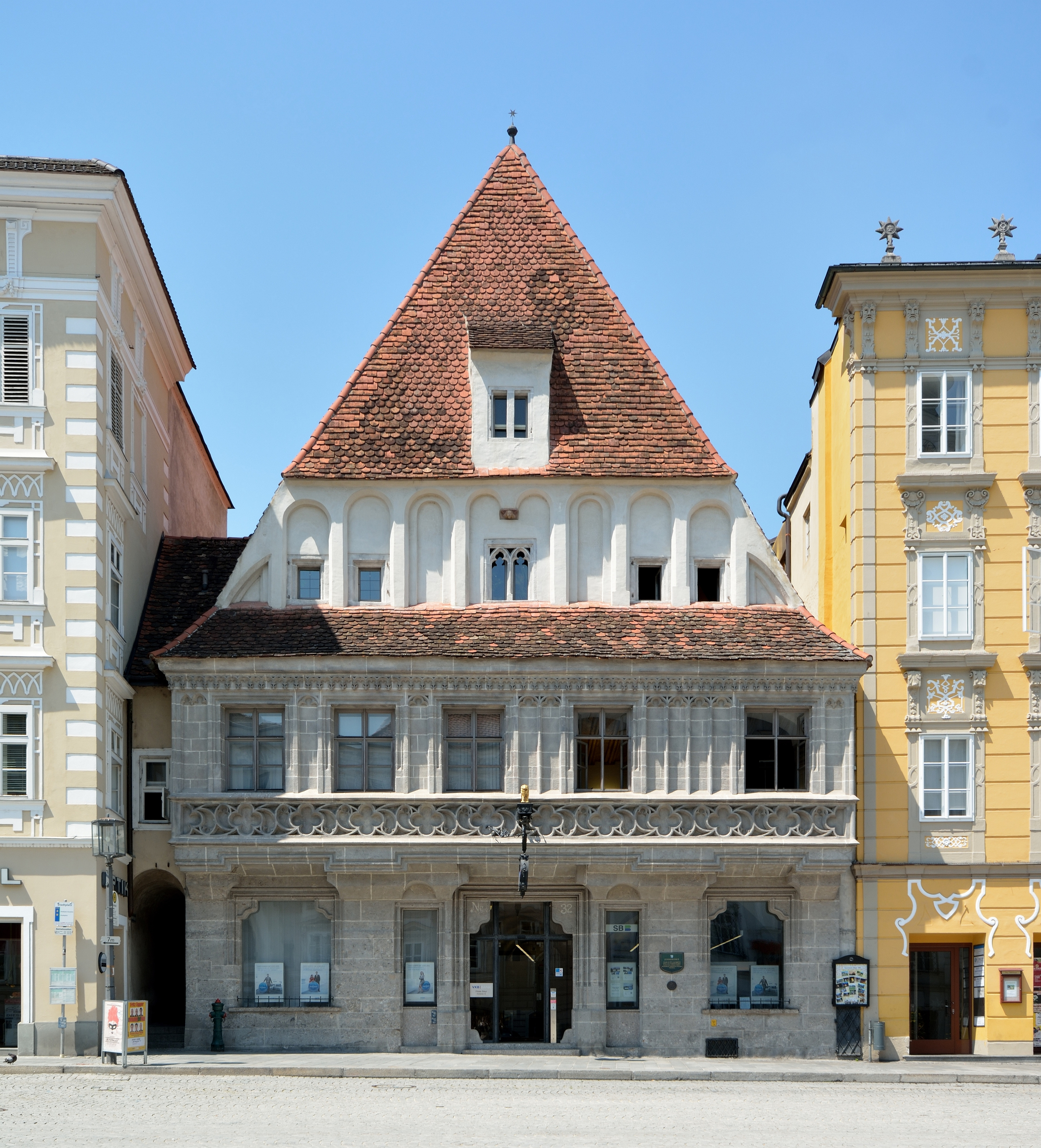
The town's landmark: Bummerlhaus

Celts settled the area from about 600 BC, the name of the Stiria River is of Celtic origin. Their kingdom of Noricum became part of the Roman Empire in 15 BC. A settlement named Gesodunum noted by the ancient geographer Claudius Ptolemy (c. 90 – c. 168) was possibly located in the Steyr region. Here the Roman "Iron Road" led from the Erzberg mine along the Enns River to the castra of Lauriacum (at present-day Enns) on the Danube.

In the 6th century, Slavic settlers moved into the area, but when they were defeated by Duke Tassilo III of Bavaria, who granted the land to nearby Kremsmünster Abbey in 777, the area was resettled with Bavarians. During the Hungarian invasions of Europe, a fortress was erected above the Steyr River by the local Traungau counts, first mentioned as Styraburg in a 980 deed. From 1055 Steyr Castle in the Bavarian Traungau as well as the adjacent "March of Styria" were ruled by the mighty Otakar dynasty. The Otokars controlled the iron mining at Erzberg and made their residence at Steyr a centre of medieval courtly culture and Middle High German poetry.

In 1180, Emperor Frederick Barbarossa elevated Margrave Ottokar IV to a Duke of Styria; however, the line became extinct upon his death in 1192 and, according to the 1186 Georgenberg Pact, his Styrian lands fell to the Babenberg dukes of Austria.

Steyr, already named a town (urbs) by then, lost its importance as a ducal residence but retained its status as a centre of ironworking. The Babenberg rulers promoted its economic development as a site of blacksmithing, mainly knife making and armament industry. After the extinction of the Babenbergs in 1246, Steyr together with the Duchy of Austria was occupied by the Přemyslid king Ottokar II of Bohemia and finally taken over by the Habsburg king Rudolf I of Germany upon his victory at the 1278 Battle on the Marchfeld. The town privileges and market rights were confirmed by Rudolf's son King Albert I in 1287 and the citizens further on benefitted of Steyr's preferred position within the iron trade all over the Holy Roman Empire and especially with the Republic of Venice.

In the 13th and 14th century, Steyr was a centre of the Christian Waldensian movement and a location of the inquisitorial persecutions led by the Catholic cleric Petrus Zwicker (d. 1403). Likewise, the Protestant Reformation quickly spread among the citizens about 1525, fiercely opposed by the Habsburg rulers in the course of the Counter-Reformation.

The economic situation changed for the worse, as the iron trade decayed during the Thirty Years' War, when Upper Austria was pawned to Duke Maximilian I of Bavaria, and the Peasants' War in Upper Austria of 1626. In 1727 the medieval Styraburg was devastated by a blaze and replaced by the Baroque Lamberg Castle. The resurgence of Steyr began under the conditions of late 18th century Josephinism and continued in the course of the succeeding industrialisation. During the Napoleonic Wars Steyr was occupied by French troops several times. On 25 December 1800, the Armistice of Steyr was signed there.

In 1830 the blacksmith Leopold Werndl founded an armory at Steyr, which his sons Josef and Franz Werndl re-established as a stock company in 1864, named the Österreichische Waffenfabriksgesellschaft (ÖWG) from 1869. Including the Steyr automobile branch from 1915 it was renamed Steyr-Werke AG in 1926 and formed a large industrial conglomerate by the merger with Austro-Daimler and Puch in 1934. However, the Steyr industry was hit hard by the 1929 Great Depression.

In 1934, the town became one of several battlegrounds between Social Democratic Schutzbund paramilitary forces and Christian Social Heimwehr militias in the Austrian Civil War, which brought about the fascist corporate Federal State of Austria that ruled the country until the 1938 Anschluss to Nazi Germany.

The Nazi authorities incorporated the armament industry into the vast Reichswerke Hermann Göring conglomerate, including the construction of the Steyr-Münichholz subcamp of forced labourers, part of the Mauthausen network. A major producer of arms and military vehicles during World War II, Steyr became a target of Allied bombing raids to knock out its factories. In two major attacks by the US Fifteenth Air Force during the "Big Week" on 23 and 24 February 1944, much of the town was badly damaged, but the factories continued to function until near the end of the war.

The city was a meeting point on 9 May 1945, when units of the 5th Guards Airborne of the Red Army and black troops of the US 761st Tank Battalion along with the 71st Infantry Division contacted each other on the bridge over the Enns River. Steyr was occupied by the U.S. Army—the Soviet Army moved east behind the demarcation line of the province of Lower Austria. The troops remained until 1955 when Austria officially declared neutrality by the Austrian State Treaty.

== Population ==
Historical population

Year	Pop.	±%
1869	16,593	—
1880	21,054	+26.9%
1890	26,139	+24.2%
1900	22,272	−14.8%
1910	22,205	−0.3%
1923	27,200	+22.5%

Year	Pop.	±%
1934	25,351	−6.8%
1939	31,017	+22.4%
1951	36,818	+18.7%
1961	38,306	+4.0%
1971	40,822	+6.6%
1981	38,942	−4.6%

Year	Pop.	±%
1991	39,337	+1.0%
2001	39,340	+0.0%
2011	38,313	−2.6%
2014	38,273	−0.1%

Largest groups of foreign residents
Nationality	Population (2026)
Bosnia and Herzegovina	1,471
Turkey	954
Hungary	815
Romania	726
Croatia	716
Germany	546
Syria	493
Serbia	458
Ukraine	413
Kosovo	289
Afghanistan	277
Slovakia	232
Russian Federation	232
Slovenia	157
Czech Republic	131
Poland	108
Italy	91
North Macedonia	89
Bulgaria	73
Iraq	61
Iran	43

== Politics ==
The municipal council (Gemeinderat) consists of 35 members. Following the 2021 Upper Austrian Local Elections, the seat distribution is as follows:

- Social Democratic Party of Austria (SPÖ): 17 seats
- Freedom Party of Austria (FPÖ): 7 seats
- Austrian People's Party (ÖVP): 6 seats
- The Greens - The Green Alternative (GRÜNE): 3 seats
- People - Freedom - Fundamental Rights (MFG): 2 seats
- NEOS - The New Austria (NEOS): 1 seat

The mayor of Steyr, Markus Vogl (SPÖ), was elected in 2021.

== Economy ==
The most heavily represented sector is manufacturing automotive parts. The most significant companies in Steyr are:

- BMW
- GFM Steyr GmbH
- MAN....since 2021. Steyr Automotive
- NKE AUSTRIA GmbH
- Profactor
- SKF
- Steyr Motors
- ZF Steyr

In other sectors are also important Austrian companies in Steyr:

- AVL List
- Eckelt Glass GmbH
- Hartlauer
- Steyr-Mannlicher

== Infrastructure ==
=== Health systems ===
The Pyhrn-Eisenwurzen Klinikum Steyr is the general hospital of the city and the largest health care provider in the region with a capacity of 621 beds. It is also a teaching hospital affiliated with the medical universities of Vienna, Graz and Innsbruck.

The Steyr School of General Health and Nursing offers a degree in nursing science and training to become a certified nurse. The oldest part is the 1916 castle-like old building. The hospital has been continually expanded since 1935.

=== Energy ===
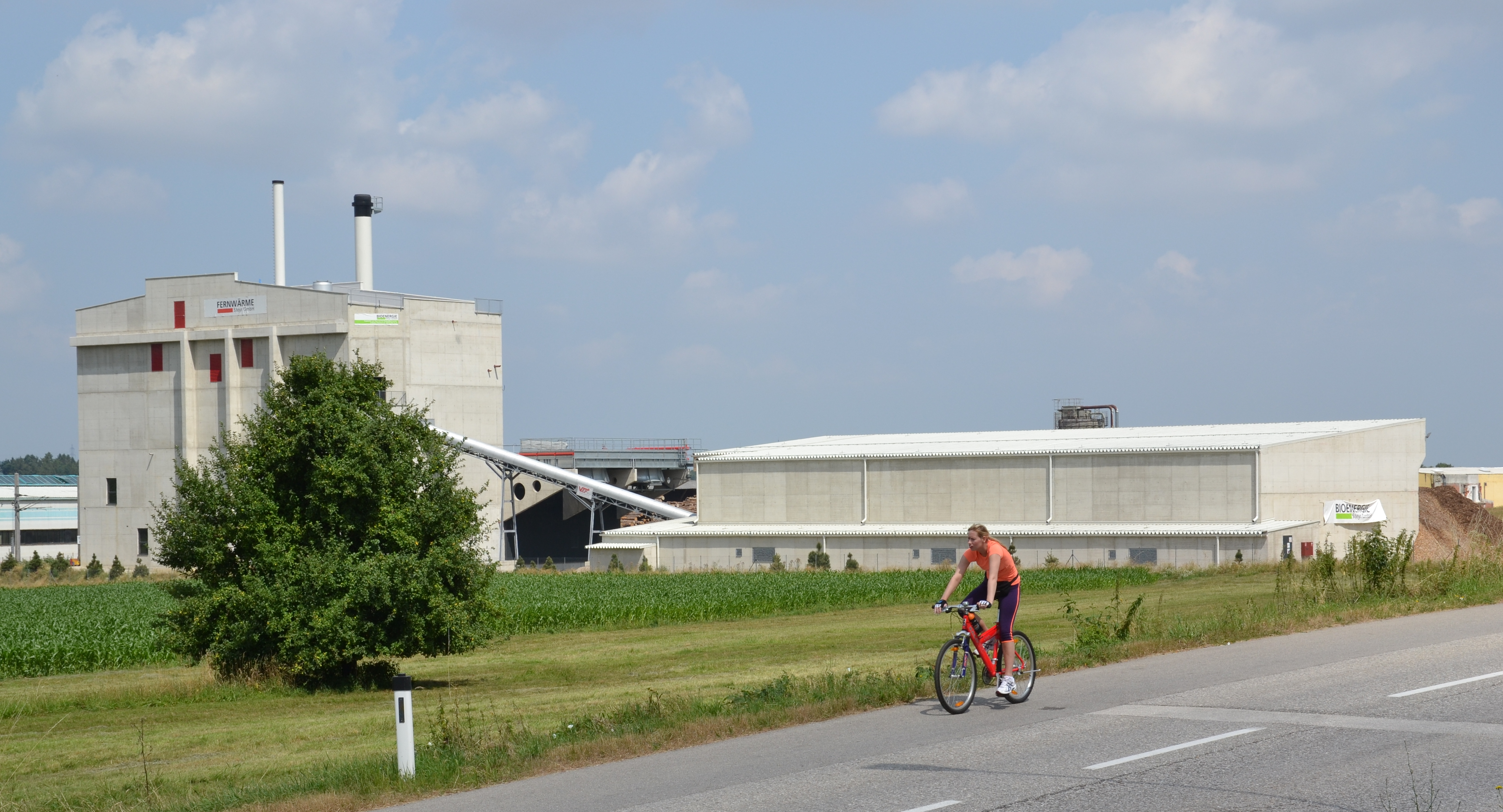
Outside view of the biomass heating plant Steyr

Steyr has a district heating system which supplies the bulk of the buildings and industry with renewable energy. The thermal energy comes from the Steyr biomass heating plant.

=== Transport ===
The city does not have its own airport. The nearest airports are:

- Linz Airport, located 43 km (27 mi) north west
- Salzburg Airport, located 158 km (98 mi) south west
- Vienna Airport, located 189 km (117 mi) east

== Sport ==
The local professional football team is SK Vorwärts Steyr who play at the Vorwärts Stadium.

== Notable people ==
Steyr has had a number of well-known residents or visitors, including Franz Schubert (1797–1828), who wrote his Trout Quintet there while on holiday in 1819, and composer Anton Bruckner (1824–1896), organist at the local parish church. Young Adolf Hitler spent a brief period there while he attended the Steyr secondary school in 1904, living in a room on Grünmarkt. The school is located in the same building as the famous Saint Michael's Church. Further notable natives of Steyr are:

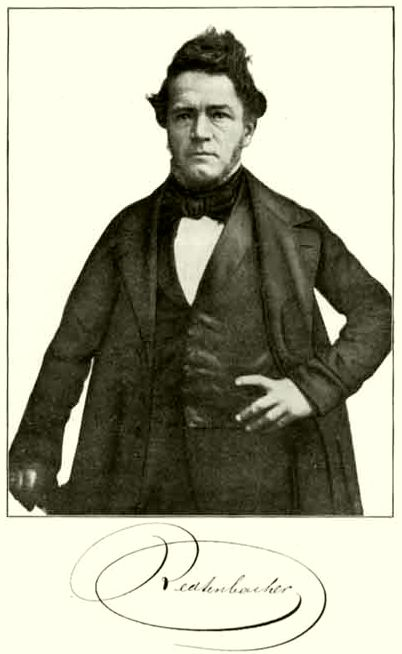
Ferdinand Redtenbacher

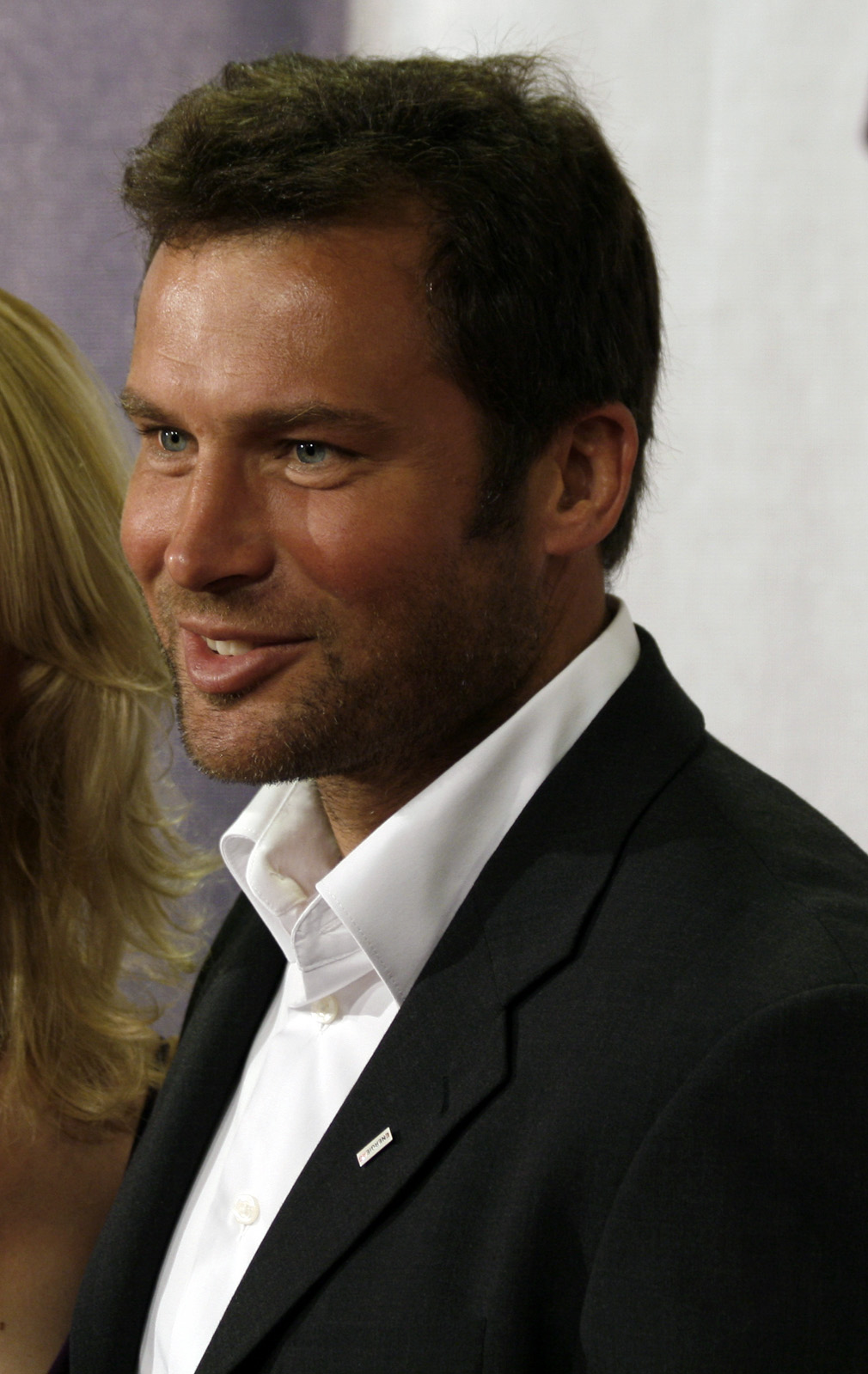
Hannes Trinkl, 2008

- Marlen Haushofer (1920–1970) author, most famous for her novel The Wall (1963).
- Johannes Stabius (c. 1460–1522), cartographer
- Wolff Jakob Lauffensteiner (1676–1754), eminent Austrian lutenist active in the Bavarian court
- Johann Michael Vogl (1768–1840), baritone singer and composer; close friend of Franz Schubert
- Johann Mayrhofer (1787–1836), poet and librettist; close friend of Franz Schubert
- Ferdinand Redtenbacher (1809–1863), engineer, founded science-based mechanical engineering
- Josef Werndl (1831–1889), arms producer, engineer and inventor
- Franz Wickhoff (1853–1909), Austrian art historian and a member of the Vienna School of Art History.
- Ignaz Trollmann (1860-1919), general in the Austro-Hungarian Army
- Michael Blümelhuber (1865–1936), metalcutter
- Erling Poppe (1898–1970), motor vehicle designer, raised in England, who studied engineering in Birmingham
- Robert Scholz (1902–1986), American pianist, conductor, composer and teacher who worked in Taiwan
- August Eigruber (1907–1947), Nazi Gauleiter hanged for war crimes
- Franz Schausberger (born 1950), politician (ÖVP) & governor of Salzburg, 1996 to 2004
- Erich Hackl (born 1954), novelist and short story writer
- Wilhelm Molterer (born 1955), politician
- Gabriel Felbermayr (born 1976), distinguished Austrian economist

=== Sport ===
- Helmut Köglberger (1946-2018), footballer, played over 440 games and 28 for Austria
- Hannes Trinkl (born 1968), former alpine skier and bronze medallist at the 1998 Winter Olympics
- Stella Staudinger (born 1972), former professional basketball player
- Ronald Brunmayr (born 1975), football player, played over 470 games and 8 for Austria
- Georg Harding (born 1981), football player, played over 260 games
- Thomas Fröschl (born 1988), footballer who has played over 380 games
- Emanuel Schreiner (born 1989), football player, played over 330 games
- Kristijan Dobras (born 1992), footballer who has played over 240 games
- Kevin Stöger (born 1993), football player, played over 260 games

== International relations ==
Steyr is twinned with:

- Bethlehem, Palestine
- (United States) Kettering, USA
- Plauen, Germany
- San Benedetto del Tronto, Italy
