= Austrian schilling =

Currency of Austria (1925–1938, 1945–2002)

Österreichischer Schilling (German)
- 20 schilling note, issued in 1986

ISO 4217
- Code: ATS

Units of account
- Plural: Schilling
- Symbol: S or öS
- Subunit
- 1/100: groschen
- Plural
- groschen: Groschen

Denominations
- Banknotes
- Freq. used: 20, 50, 100, 500 & 1000 schilling
- Rarely used: 5000 schilling
- Coins
- Freq. used: 10 & 50 groschen, 1, 5 & 10 schilling
- Rarely used: 1, 2 & 5 groschen, 20 & 50 schilling

Demographics
- Replaced: Austrian krone
- User(s): None, previously: Austria

Issuance
- Central bank: Oesterreichische Nationalbank
- Website: www.oenb.at
- Mint: Austrian Mint
- Website: austrian-mint.com

Valuation
- Inflation: 2%
- Source: CIA World Factbook 2001

EU Exchange Rate Mechanism (ERM)
- Since: 19 June 1989
- Fixed rate since: 31 December 1998
- Replaced by euro, non cash: 1 January 1999
- Replaced by euro, cash: 1 March 2002
- 1 € =: S 13.7603
- This infobox shows the latest status before this currency was rendered obsolete.

The schilling (German pronunciation: [ˈʃɪliŋ]) was a currency of Austria from 1925 to 1938 and from 1945 to 2002. The euro was introduced at a fixed parity of €1 = 13.7603 schilling to replace it. The schilling was divided into 100 Groschen.

== History ==
Following the Carolingian coin reform in 794 AD, new units of account were introduced, including the schilling, which consisted of 12 silver pfennige. It was initially only a coin of account but later became an actual coin produced in many European countries.

=== Before the modern Austrian schilling ===
The currencies preceding the schilling include:

- The florin, in existence as a currency of the Holy Roman Empire since the 16th century, divided into 8 Schilling = 60 Kreuzer = 240 Pfennige
- The Austro-Hungarian gulden after 1857, divided into 100 Neukreuzer
- The Austro-Hungarian krone, introduced in 1892 upon adoption of the gold standard; and
- The Austrian crown, introduced for Austria in 1919 upon the dissolution of the Austro-Hungarian Empire.

In mediaeval Austria, there were short and long schilling coins, valued at 12 and 30 Pfennige respectively. Until 1857, the Schilling was a currency unit for 30 Pfennige or 7 1/2 Kreuzer. The Austrian Groschen (also known as the Kaisergroschen, lit. 'emperor's groschen' or 'emperor's groat') was a silver coin worth 12 Pfennige = 3 Kreuzer = 2/5 Schilling.

=== First Austrian schilling ===
The schilling was established by the Schilling Act (Schillingrechnungsgesetz) of 20 December 1924, at a rate of one schilling to 10,000 paper kronen and issued on 1 March 1925. The schilling was abolished in the wake of Germany's annexation of Austria in 1938, when it was exchanged at a rate of 1.50 schilling for one Reichsmark.

=== Second Austrian schilling ===
The schilling was reintroduced after World War II on 30 November 1945 by the Allied Military, who issued paper money (dated 1944) in denominations of 50 groschen, 1, 2, 5, 10, 20, 25, 50, 100, and 1000 schilling. The exchange rate to the Reichsmark was 1:1, limited to 150 schilling per person. The Nationalbank also began issuing schilling notes in 1945 and the first coins were issued in 1946.

With a second "schilling" law on 21 November 1947, new banknotes were introduced. The earlier notes could be exchanged for new notes at par for the first 150 schilling and at a rate of 1 new schilling for 3 old schillings thereafter. This reform did not affect coins. The currency stabilised in the 1950s, with the schilling being tied to the U.S. dollar at a rate of $1 = 26 schilling. Following the breakdown of the Bretton Woods system in 1971, the schilling was initially tied to a basket of currencies until July 1976, when it was coupled to the German mark.

Although the euro became the official currency of Austria in 1999, euro coins and notes were not introduced until 2002. Old schilling denominated coins and notes were phased out from circulation because of the introduction of the euro by 28 February of that year. Schilling banknotes and coins which were valid at the time of the introduction of the euro will indefinitely remain exchangeable for euros at any branch of the Oesterreichische Nationalbank.

== Coins ==
=== First schilling ===
In 1925, bronze 1 and 2 groschen, cupro-nickel 10 groschen, and silver 1/2 and 1 schilling coins were introduced, followed by cupro-nickel 5 groschen issues in 1931. In 1934, cupro-nickel 50 groschen and 1 schilling were introduced, together with silver 5 schilling. Coins were issued until 1938.

Also issued gold and silver coins: 2 schillings (1937) – 64% silver, 5 schillings (1934) – 83% silver, 25 schillings (1926) – 90% gold, 100 schillings (1924) – 90% gold.

=== Second schilling ===
Between 1947 and 1952, coins in denominations of 1, 2, 5, 10, 20, and 50 groschen; and 1, 2, and 5 schilling were introduced. The 1, 5, 10, and 50 groschen were initially made from leftover blanks from the wartime pfennig issues. The 2 and 50 groschen; 1, 2, and 5 schilling were struck in aluminium, as was the second type of 10 groschen coin. The 1 and 5 groschen and the first type of 10 groschen were in zinc, with the 20 groschen struck in aluminium-bronze. The 1 groschen was only struck in 1947, while the 20 groschen and 2 schilling coins were suspended from production in 1954 and 1952, respectively. In 1957, silver 10 schilling coins were introduced, followed in 1959 by aluminium-bronze 50 groschen and 1 schilling, and in 1960 by silver 5 schilling coins. As a result, the composition of the 5 Schilling coins changed from aluminum to silver in the 1950s, which was a highly unusual event. Cupro-nickel replaced silver in the 5 and 10 schilling coins in 1969 and 1974, respectively. An aluminium-bronze 20 schilling coin was introduced in 1980.

Silver coins were in the value of 25, 50, 100, 200 and 500 schilling, but gold coins also existed for 500 and 1,000 schilling. They were considered legal currency, but were rarely found in actual transactions. Coins under 10 groschen were rarely seen in circulation during their final years.

At the time of the changeover to the euro, the coins in circulation were the following:

Coins of the Second Schilling
Image	Value	Technical parameters			Description			Issued from	First issued	Withdrawn
Image	Value	Diameter (mm)	Mass (g)	Composition	Edge	Obverse	Reverse	Issued from	First issued	Withdrawn
	1 gr.	17.00	1.80	Zinc	Smooth	Value; year of issue	Coat of arms; lettering: Republik Österreich	1947–1950	5 Apr 1948	31 Dec 2001
	2 gr.	18.00	0.90	Aluminium: 98.5% Magnesium: 1.5%	Smooth	Value; year of issue; lettering: Republik Österreich	Coat of arms	1950–1991	15 Jul 1950	31 Dec 2001
	5 gr.	19.00	2.50	Zinc	Reeded	Value; year of issue	Coat of arms; lettering: Republik Österreich	1948–1992	17 Jun 1948	31 Dec 2001
	10 gr.	21.00	3.50	Zinc	Smooth	Value; year of issue	Coat of arms; lettering: Republik Österreich	1947–1949	1 May 1947	31 Oct 1959
	10 gr.	20.00	1.10	Aluminium: 98.5% Magnesium: 1.5%	Smooth	Value; year of issue	Coat of arms; value; lettering: Republik Österreich	1951–1998	27 Nov 1951	31 Dec 2001
	20 gr.	22.00	4.50	Copper: 91.5% Aluminium: 8.5%	Smooth	Value; year of issue; lettering: Republik Österreich	Coat of arms	1950–1954	23 Dec 1950	31 Jul 1959
	50 gr.	22.00	1.40	Aluminium: 98.5% Magnesium: 1.5%	Smooth	Value; year of issue	Coat of arms; lettering: Republik Österreich	1946–1955	11 Dec 1947	31 Dec 1961
	50 gr.	19.50	3.00	Copper: 91.5% Aluminium: 8.5%	Reeded	Gentian; value; year of issue	Coat of arms; lettering: Republik Österreich	1959–1997	1 Oct 1959	31 Dec 2001
	S 1	25.00	2.00	Aluminium: 98.5% Magnesium: 1.5%	Smooth	Sower; value; year of issue; lettering: Republik Österreich	Coat of arms	1946–1957	11 Dec 1947	31 Dec 1961
	S 1	22.50	4.20	Copper: 91.5% Aluminium: 8.5%	Smooth	Value; year of issue; lettering: Republik Österreich	Edelweiss; value	1959–1998	1 Sep 1959	31 Dec 2001
	S 2	28.00	2.80	Aluminium: 98.5% Magnesium: 1.5%	Smooth	Coat of arms	Value, year of minting	1946–1952	11 Dec 1947	30 Jun 1958
	S 5	31.00	4.00	Aluminium: 98.5% Magnesium: 1.5%	Reeded	Value; year of issue; lettering: Republik Österreich	Coat of arms	1952–1957	25 Oct 1952	31 Dec 1961
	S 5	23.50	5.20	Silver: 64% Copper: 36%	Reeded	Coat of arms; value	Horse rider; lettering: Republik Österreich	1960–1968	2 Jan 1961	30 Dec 1970
	S 5	23.50	4.80	Cupronickel: Cu: 75%; Ni: 25%	Smooth	Coat of arms; value	Horse rider; lettering: Republik Österreich	1968–1998	15 Jan 1969	31 Dec 2001
	S 10	26.00	7.50	Silver: 64% Copper: 36%	Reeded	Woman; value; year of issue	Coat of arms; lettering: Republik Österreich	1957–1973	1 Jul 1957	31 Mar 1977
	S 10	26.00	6.20	Cupronickel: Cu: 75%; Ni: 25%	Reeded	Woman; value; year of issue	Coat of arms; lettering: Republik Österreich	1968–1998	15 Jan 1969	31 Dec 2001
	S 20	27.70	8.00	Aluminium bronze: Cu: 92% Al: 6% Ni: 2%	19 dots	Value; year of issue	Allegory of states; lettering: Republik Österreich	1980–1992	10 Dec 1980	31 Dec 2001
	S 20	27.70	8.00	Aluminium bronze: Cu: 92% Al: 6% Ni: 2%	Smooth	Value; year of issue	Allegory of states; lettering: Republik Österreich	1993	10 Dec 1980	31 Dec 2001
	S 20	27.70	8.00	Aluminium bronze: Cu: 92% Al: 6% Ni: 2%	19 dots	Coat of arms; value; year of issue; lettering: Republik Österreich	Various commemorative subjects	1982–1993	27 Mar 1982	31 Dec 2001
	S 20	27.70	8.00	Aluminium bronze: Cu: 92% Al: 6% Ni: 2%	Smooth	Coat of arms; value; year of issue; lettering: Republik Österreich	Various commemorative subjects	1994–2001	27 Mar 1982	31 Dec 2001
	S 50	26.50	8.15	Outer: Aluminium bronze	Smooth	States' coats of arms; value; lettering: Republik Österreich	Various commemorative subjects	1996–2001	23 Oct 1996	31 Dec 2001
	S 50	18.50	8.15	Inner: Magnimat	Smooth	States' coats of arms; value; lettering: Republik Österreich	Various commemorative subjects	1996–2001	23 Oct 1996	31 Dec 2001
For table standards, see the coin specification table.

== Banknotes ==
=== First schilling ===
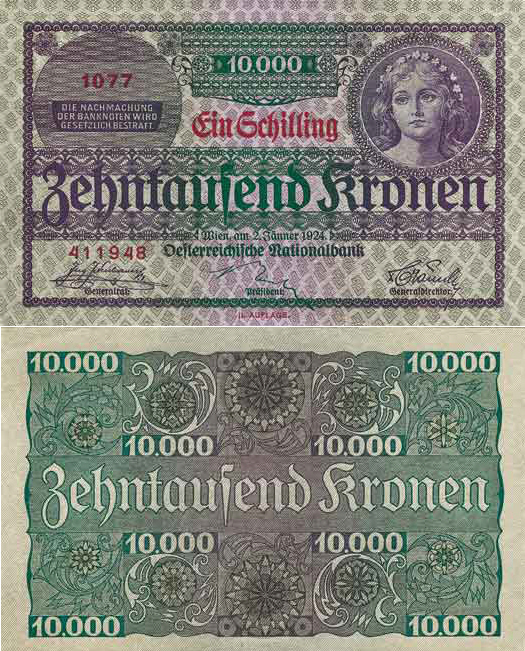
1 Schilling (1925)

In 1925, the Oesterreichische Nationalbank issued notes in denominations of 1, 5, 10, 20, 100 and 1,000 Schillinge (note the different spelling of the plural on this first 1925-series of notes). The one-schilling notes were overprints of 10,000 Krone notes.

In 1927–1929 a second series was added with 5, 10, 20, 50 and 100 schilling notes. The one schilling was substituted by a coin.

=== Second schilling ===
In 1945, the Allies introduced notes (dated 1944) in denominations of 50 groschen, 1, 2, 5, 10, 20, 25, 50, 100 and 1,000 schilling. The Oesterreichische Nationalbank also introduced notes in 1945, in denominations of 10, 20, 100 and 1,000 schilling and the allied currency with small values up to 5 schilling remained valid until 1947. With the banknote reform of 1947, new notes were issued in denominations of 5, 10, 20, 50, 100 and 1,000 schilling. Until 1957, the first 500 schilling banknote was issued and the 5 and 10 schilling notes were replaced by coins. However, although 20 schilling coins were issued from 1980, the 20 schilling note continued to be produced, with 5,000 schilling notes added in 1988.

Penultimate series (1983–1989) Designer: Robert Kalina
Image	Value	Euro equivalent	Dimensions (mm)	Main colour	Description		First printed	First issued	Withdrawn	Lapse
Image	Value	Euro equivalent	Dimensions (mm)	Main colour	Obverse	Reverse	First printed	First issued	Withdrawn	Lapse
	S 20	€1.45	123 × 62	Olive	Moritz Daffinger	Albertina	1 Oct 1986	19 Oct 1988	28 Feb 2002	Unlimited
	S 50	€3.63	130 × 65	Purple	Sigmund Freud	Josephinum	2 Jan 1986	19 Oct 1987	28 Feb 2002	Unlimited
	S 100	€7.27	137 × 68	Green	Eugen von Böhm-Bawerk	Academy of Sciences	2 Jan 1984	14 Oct 1985	28 Feb 2002	Unlimited
	S 500	€36.34	144 × 72	Red	Otto Wagner	Postal Savings Bank	1 Jul 1985	20 Jun 1986	20 Apr 1998	20 Apr 2018
	S 1000	€72.67	152 × 76	Blue	Erwin Schrödinger	University of Vienna	3 Jan 1983	14 Nov 1983	20 Apr 1998	20 Apr 2018
	S 5000	€363.36	160 × 80	Brown	Wolfgang Amadeus Mozart	Vienna State Opera	4 Jan 1988	17 Oct 1989	28 Feb 2002	Unlimited
Last series (1997) Designer: Robert Kalina
	S 500	€36.34	149 × 72	Orange	Rosa Mayreder	Women's Associations meeting, Vienna (1911)	1 Jan 1997	20 Oct 1997	28 Feb 2002	Unlimited
	S 1000	€72.67	154 × 72	Blue	Karl Landsteiner	Landsteiner in a laboratory	1 Jan 1997	20 Oct 1997	28 Feb 2002	Unlimited
For table standards, see the banknote specification table.

== See also ==
- Adoption of the euro in Austria
- Austrian euro coins
- Economy of Austria
- Edwin Grienauer
- Shilling
- Schilling (unit) - a unit of measurement that preceded the Austrian schilling

Old Schilling
Preceded by: Austrian krone Reason: inflation Ratio: 1 Schilling = 10,000 Kronen	Currency of Austria; 1925 – 1938	Succeeded by: German Reichsmark; Reason: German annexation (Anschluss); Ratio: 1 Reichsmark = 1.5 Schilling

Allied Military Schilling
Preceded by: German Reichsmark; Reason: restoration of sovereignty, under allied occupation Ratio: at par, limited to 150 schilling per person	Currency of Austria; 30 November 1945 – November 1947	Succeeded by: New Schilling; Reason: inflation Ratio: at par for the first 150 schilling per person, then 1 new Schilling = 3 Allied Military Schilling

New Schilling
Preceded by: Allied Military Schilling; Reason: inflation Ratio: at par for the first 150 Schilling per person, then 1 Schilling = 3 allied military sSchilling	Currency of Austria; 1947 – 31 December 2001; Note: euro existed as an accounting currency since 1 January 1999	Succeeded by: Euro; Reason: deployment of euro cash Ratio: 1 euro = 13.7603 Schilling
