= Austrian krone =

Currency of Austria and Liechtenstein from 1919 to 1925

Österreichische Krone (German)
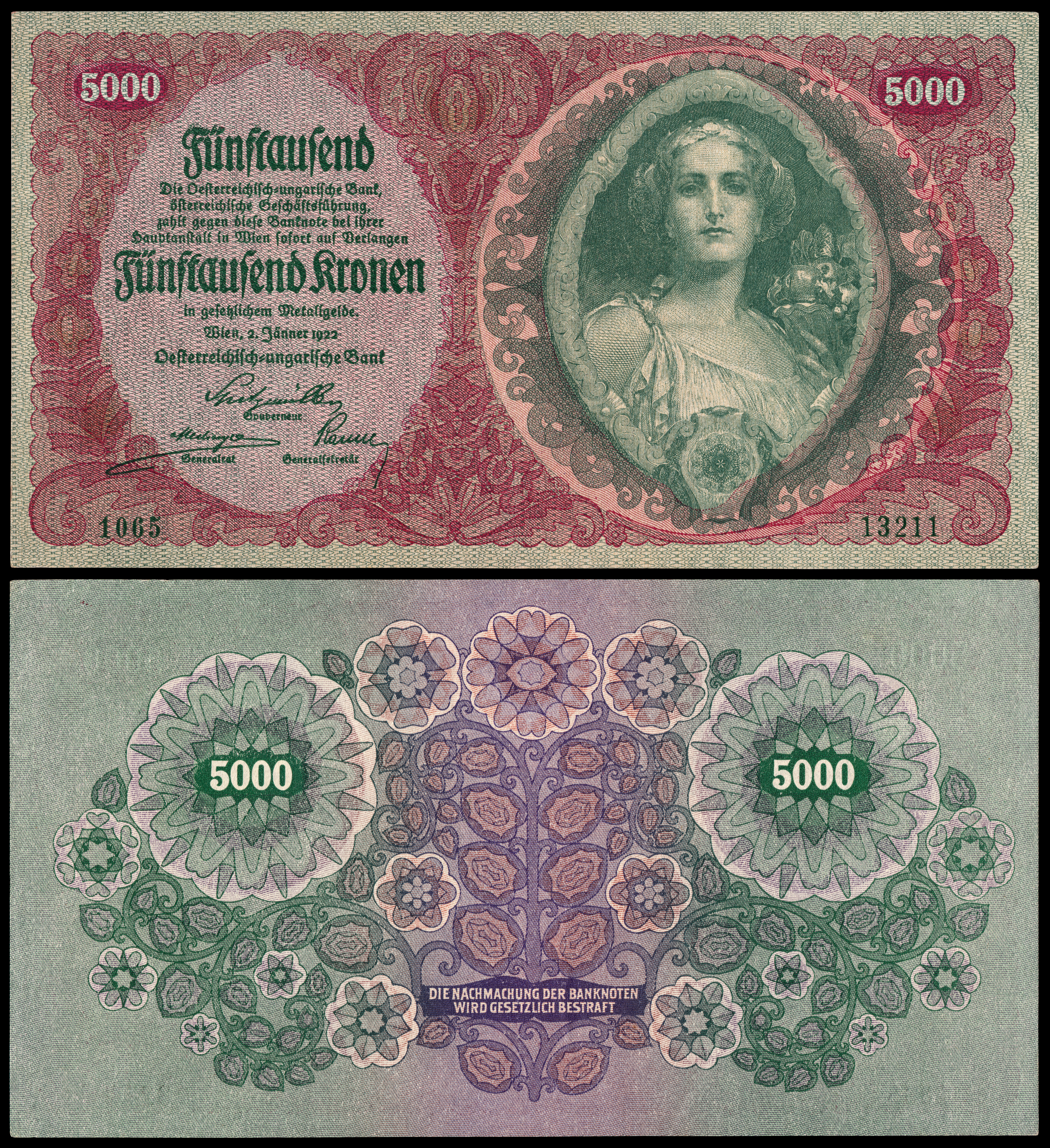
- 5000 kronen banknote, 1922

Units of account
- Symbol: K
- Subunit
- 1/100: heller

Denominations
- Banknotes: 1 Krone, 2, 10, 20, 100, 1000, 5000, 10000, 50000, 100000 and 500000 Kronen
- Coins: 100, 200, 1000 Kronen (20, 100 Kronen gold coins)

Demographics
- User(s): Austria, Liechtenstein

Issuance
- Central bank: Oesterreichisch-ungarische Bank, Oesterreichische Nationalbank
- This infobox shows the latest status before this currency was rendered obsolete.

The Krone (pl. Kronen) was the currency of Austria (then known as German-Austria) and Liechtenstein after the dissolution of the Austro-Hungarian Empire (1919) until the introduction of the Austrian schilling (1925), and, in Liechtenstein, the Swiss franc.

== Coins ==
Coins included 20 and 100 Krone gold coins minted with the same standard as their Austro-Hungarian krone counterparts.

To ease the introduction of the new currency, 100, 200 and 1000 Kronen coins were minted right before 1925 with the same parameters as the equivalent Groschen coins (1, 2 and 10 Groschen) that replaced them.

== Paper money ==
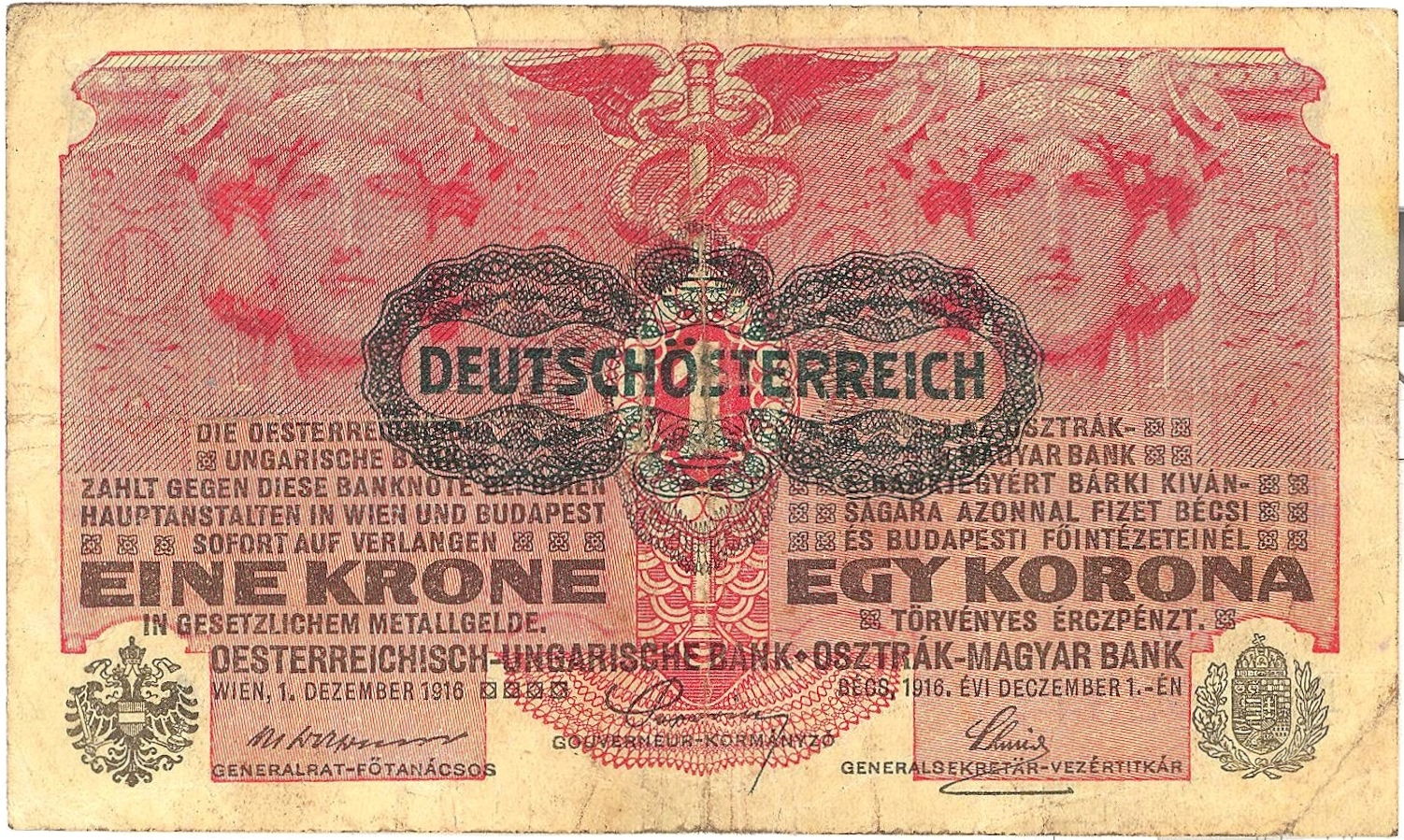
1-krone note with DEUTSCHÖSTERREICH overprint

According to the provisions of the Treaty of St. Germain the newly created Republic of Austria had to overstamp the old paper money of the former Austro-Hungarian Empire still circulating in its territory, then had to replace the overstamped banknotes with new ones, and finally had to introduce an entirely new currency.

To fulfil the first step, circulating banknotes were overstamped with the inscription DEUTSCHÖSTERREICH ("German-Austria"), and new banknotes were also issued with this feature. Later, still under the name Oesterreichisch-ungarische Bank, banknotes were printed using the German-language clichés on both sides – and still bearing the DEUTSCHÖSTERREICH inscription. From 1920 on a new stamp appeared on banknotes: "Ausgegeben nach dem 4. Oktober 1920".

In 1922 a new series of Krone banknotes was introduced with a completely new design to fulfil the second step. The series contained 1 Krone, 2, 10, 20, 100, 1000, 5000, 50 000, 100 000 and 500 000 Kronen, later 10 000 Kronen (1 000 000 Kronen was planned but not issued).

In 1923 the League of Nations Financial Committee, with support from the Bank of England under Montagu Norman, provided a loan to allow Austria to stabilize the krone against the U.S. dollar in exchange for austerity measures. By that time, one gold krone was valued at 14,400 kronen in paper.

In 1925, as the third step, the new Schilling banknotes were emitted.

== Historic exchange rates and prices ==
Year	Rates
1919	1 US dollar = K 16.10 (January).; Illustrierte Kronenzeitung January–June: 10 heller/copy or K 3.– for a monthly subscription. July–December: 12 heller/copy or K 3.60 for a monthly subscription.; K 100.– = 11.60 Swiss francs (August).; K 1.– = 0.3125 German marks (October); K 4.– = 1 Yugoslav dinar = 2 Romanian lei (November).; K 100.– = 2.75 Swiss francs (December)
1921	K 2000 = 1 Swiss franc (March)
