= Coat of arms of Austria =

Coat of arms of the Republic of Austria Wappen der Republik Österreich (Bundeswappen)

Versions
- Bundeswappen like the heraldic description in Art. 8a Abs. 2 B-VG but with detailed eagle's feathers

- Bundeswappen like the heraldic description in Art. 8a Abs. 2 B-VG with simplified eagle's feathers
- Armiger: Republic of Austria
- Adopted: 1984 (1945)
- Shield: Gules, a fess Argent
- Supporters: An eagle displayed sable, armed Or, langued Gules, crowned with a Mural crown of 3 turrets Or, bound at the wrists by shackles with broken chains proper, holding in dexter a sickle and in its sinister a hammer all Or.
- Earlier version: Coat of arms of the Republic of German-Austria and the First Austrian Republic, 1919–1934, like the current version but without broken chains, here in a heraldic version Coat of arms of the Federal State of Austria, 1934–1938, in an imperial-style double-headed eagle

The current coat of arms of the Republic of Austria has been in use in its first forms by the Republic of German-Austria since 1919. Between 1934 and the German annexation in 1938, the Federal State (Bundesstaat Österreich) used a different coat of arms, which consisted of a double-headed eagle (one-party corporate state led by the clerico-right-wing Fatherland Front, often labeled Austro-fascist).

The establishment of the Second Republic in 1945 saw the return of the original arms, with broken chains added to symbolise Austria's liberation. In 1981 the Wappen der Republik Österreich (Bundeswappen) described the blazon in the Federal Constitutional Law (Austrian act) (Bundes-Verfassungsgesetz, B-VG). With this change of law it was defined that the specific drawing is to codificate in an own statute law and that all other versions of the coat of arms of Austria were no longer in law. In accordance to this the Wappengesetz from 1984 and the drawing of the actual Wappen der Republik Österreich is in Austrian law. The often used Bundesadler (federal eagle) is only a synonymous term in colloquial language.

== Description ==
=== Appearance ===
In Art. 8a Abs. 2 B-VG the blazon of the Federal Arms of the Republic of Austria is described as follows:

Das Wappen der Republik Österreich (Bundeswappen) besteht aus einem freischwebenden, einköpfigen, schwarzen, golden gewaffneten und rot bezungten Adler, dessen Brust mit einem roten, von einem silbernen Querbalken durchzogenen Schild belegt ist. Der Adler trägt auf seinem Haupt eine goldene Mauerkrone mit drei sichtbaren Zinnen. Die beiden Fänge umschließt eine gesprengte Eisenkette. Er trägt im rechten Fang eine goldene Sichel mit einwärts gekehrter Schneide, im linken Fang einen goldenen Hammer.

In translation:

The coat of arms of the Republic of Austria (federal coat of arms) consists of a free-floating, single-headed, black eagle with golden arms and a red tongue, whose chest is covered with a red shield crossed by a silver crossbar. The eagle wears a golden mural crown with three visible pinnacles on its head. A broken iron chain encloses the two talons. In his right talon he carries a golden sickle with the edge turned inwards, in his left talon a golden hammer.

In accordance of Art. 8a Abs. 3 the actual withdrawn of the Wappen der Republik Österreich is in law as of § 1 Wappengesetz from 1984:

Das Wappen der Republik Österreich (Bundeswappen) ist im Art. 8a Abs. 2 B-VG bestimmt und entspricht der Zeichnung des Bundeswappens in der einen Bestandteil dieses Gesetzes bildenden Anlage 1.

This artistic version as above described with the drawing in attachment 1 of Wappengesetz 1984 in which the eagle's feathers are grey and detailed, with the colours of bluegrey for the chain and dark gold for the other signs, is the actual official coat of arms of the Republic of Austria. There are some other different versions of the arms in use as of more in accordance to the blason of Art. 8a Abs. 2 B-VG, in which the eagle is represented plain black, the undefined colour of the chain and the yellow as heraldic gold. All these versions are used in parallel.

=== Symbolism ===
The symbols used in the Austrian coat of arms are as follows:

- The Eagle: Austria's sovereignty (introduced 1919)
- The escutcheon: Emblem of Austria (late Middle Ages, reintroduced 1915; see also: Flag of Austria)
- The mural crown: Middle class (bourgeoisie, introduced 1919)
- The sickle: Farmer's class (peasants, introduced 1919)
- The Hammer: Working class (introduced 1919)
- The broken chains: Liberation from German occupation (added 1945)

Discussions about the arms have been triggered in the past by differing political interpretations, especially by the use of the hammer and the sickle and the broken chains, since the crossed hammer and sickle are a widespread symbol of communism, as is the breaking of chains. Surveys have, however, confirmed that understanding of the actual symbolism of the arms is widespread.

On the one hand the arms serve as a new republican symbol, on the other as a modified version of the historical Habsburg arms. The current version of the arms is often regarded as being reminiscent of the double-headed eagle of the Habsburg monarchy. According to this interpretation, the single headed eagle alludes, in the sense of the removal of the left hand, "Hungarian" head, to the removal of the eastern part of the Habsburg Empire. However, Addendum 202 to the 1919 Law on the State Arms and the State Seal of the Republic of German-Austria (Gesetz über das Staatswappen und das Staatssiegel der Republik Deutschösterreich) states expressly that the "new" single headed Austrian eagle is based not on the double headed eagle (symbol of the Habsburgs since 1804, and previously of the Holy Roman Empire), but rather on the "symbol of the legions of the Roman Republic", the Aquila. The Austrian federal states have however retained pre-republican heraldic traditions (mostly heraldic images from the Middle Ages, but also diverse accoutrements such as archducal and ducal hats, and knights' helmets, among other things).

=== The tower emblem as first proposal in 1918 ===
Reconstruction of the tower emblem

On 31 October 1918, the council of state agreed upon the colours of the republic (red-white-red) as well as the new emblem composed personally by chancellor Karl Renner. The coat of arms was composed quickly due to the need for having a seal at the peace talks after World War I. The emblem consisted of a black tower representing the bourgeoisie, two crossed red hammers representing workers and a golden wreath of wheat representing farmers. The colours black, red and gold was deliberately chosen because they were the national colours of Germany, the three colours associated with republican Germany (as opposed to red, white and black), as first manifested within German lands in 1778.

However, the new emblazon was withdrawn as it was met with heavy criticism from, for example, Adolf Loos and heraldists; the proposal was seen as too similar to commercial advertising. A decision by the council of ministers on 8 May 1919 replaced the tower emblem with the eagle.

== See also ==
- Flag of Austria
- Flags of Austrian states
- Coats of arms of the Austrian states
- Coat of arms of Austria-Hungary

== Literature ==
- Diem, Peter (1995). Die Symbole Österreichs. Zeit und Geschichte in Zeichen (in German). Vienna, Austria: Kremayr & Scheriau. ISBN 3-218-00594-9. Archived from the original on 2019-11-11.
- Hye, F-H. (1995). Das Österreichische Staatswappen und seine Geschichte (in German). Innsbruck, Austria: Studien Verlag. ISBN 3-7065-1108-8.
- Gall, Franz (1996). Österreichische Wappenkunde. Handbuch der Wappenwissenschaft (in German). Vienna, Austria: Böhlau. ISBN 3-205-98646-6.
- Diem, Peter (1995). "Die Entwicklung der Symbole der Republik Österreich". In Karner, Stefan; Mikoletzky, Lorenz (eds.). Österreich. 90 Jahre Republik [Austria. 90 Years Republic] (in German). Innsbruck, Austria. ISBN 978-3-7065-4664-5.
