= AAP =

Aap or AAP may refer to:

== Language ==
- Ap (water), a Sanskrit word
- Pará Arára language, a Cariban language of Brazil

== Organizations ==
=== Academic and professional associations ===
- American Academy of Pediatrics, an American and Canadian professional medical fellowship
- American Academy of Periodontology, a professional organization for periodontists
- Association of American Physicians, a medical honor society
- Association of Australasian Palaeontologists
- Australasian Association of Philosophy

=== Government and military ===
- Agrupación Aérea Presidencial, the Argentine president's personal air fleet
- Airport Armed Police in Bangladesh
- Apollo Applications Program, a NASA program

=== Schools ===
- Ann Arbor Pioneer High School, a high school in Michigan, US
- Cornell University College of Architecture, Art, and Planning, New York, US

=== Other organizations ===
- Aam Aadmi Party, a political party in India
- Advance Auto Parts, an American vehicle parts retailer
- Associated Artists Productions, a film distributor
- Association of American Publishers, a US trade association
- Australian Associated Press, Australia's national news agency
- Automobile Association Philippines, a member of the Fédération Internationale de l'Automobile

== Science and technology ==
=== Biology and medicine ===
- Aerobic anoxygenic phototroph, a metabolic classification of bacteria
- Alanine aminopeptidase, a medical biomarker enzyme
- Atypical antipsychotic, a group of antipsychotic drugs

=== Computing ===
- A-A-P, a computer software build and installation utility
- Advanced Active Partition, a special type of active partition in a MBR

== Transport infrastructure ==
- Aappilattoq Heliport (Avannaata) in Aappilattoq, Greenland
- Aircraft Acceptance Point, a term used by the Royal Flying Corps to designate Lympne Aerodrome (later RAF Lympne)
- Aji Pangeran Tumenggung Pranoto International Airport in Samarinda, East Kalimantan Province, Indonesia (IATA airport code AAP)
- Alexandra Palace railway station in London, UK
- Andrau Airpark, a former airport in Houston, Texas, US

== Other uses ==
- Accredited ACH Professional, an Electronic Payments Professional
- Agrupación Aérea Presidencial, the Argentine president's personal air fleet
- Argumentum ad populum, a logical fallacy
- ArtAsiaPacific, a contemporary art and culture magazine

== See also ==
- 2AP (disambiguation)
- AAAP (disambiguation)
- AAPP (disambiguation)
- AAPS (disambiguation)
- AP (disambiguation)
- APP (disambiguation)
- APA (disambiguation)
- PAA (disambiguation)
