= APAP =

Apap or APAP may refer to:

== Medical ==
- Paracetamol (or acetaminophen), an analgesic drug, also known as APAP from its chemical name N-acetyl-para-aminophenol
- Automatic Positive Airway Pressure, a medical device used to treat breathing disorders like sleep apnea

== People ==
Apap is a common surname in Malta, which originates from Gozo in the 16th century

- Antonia Apap (19th century), mother of Karmni Grima
- David Apap, 1990s Maltese politician, see List of mayors of places in Malta
- Gilles Apap (born 1963), a French violinist
- Ferdinando Apap (born 1992), Maltese soccer player
- Joseph Apap (20th century), Maltese musician, brother of William and Vincent
- Julie Apap (1948–2011), Maltese ceramicist
- Lorenzo de Apapis (c. 1501–1586), Gozitan priest and notary
- Louis Apap, 1990s Maltese politician, see List of mayors of places in Malta
- Vincent Apap (1909–2003; aka Ċensu Apap), Maltese sculptor
- William Apap (1918–1970), Maltese painter

== Other uses ==
- Association of Performing Arts Presenters, American organisation of arts professionals

== See also ==
- Villa Apap Bologna, Attard, Malta; the official residence of the ambassador of the US to Malta; see List of ambassadors of the United States to Malta
- AP (disambiguation)
- 2AP (disambiguation)
- AP2 (disambiguation)
