= Raymond L. Erikson =

American virologist, biologist, and molecular biologist (1936–2020)

Raymond Leo Erikson (January 24, 1936 – March 30, 2020) was a molecular biologist and virologist who noted research on cell growth and regulation. He also served as the John F. Drum American Cancer Society Professor of Cellular and Developmental Biology at Harvard University.

== Childhood ==
Erikson was born in Eagle, Wisconsin, on a dairy farm that was settled by his father and grandfather. Erikson was the oldest of two children. Being from a small village, Erikson went to school in a one-room school house before going off to college.

== Collegiate career ==
Erikson went to the University of Wisconsin-Madison with the intent of being an agricultural sciences teacher. It was not until his junior year where he gained interest in molecular biology after taking a course at college. After taking the course, Erikson developed a passion for molecular biology. In 1958, Erikson enrolled in the University of Wisconsin-Madison's graduate school where he worked with Dr. Waclaw Szybalski. In 1963, Erikson had earned a Ph.D.

== Professional career ==
Upon completion of his Ph.D., Erikson moved out to Colorado and began pursuing a career in molecular biology research. Erikson spent a sabbatical (1972–1973) at the Imperial Cancer Research Fund Laboratories, where he became immersed in avian sarcoma virus-mediated transformation of cells. After his sabbatical, in 1976 at the Richard M. Franklin at University of Colorado School of Medicine, he researched RNA bacteriophages. After focusing on RNA bacteriophages, Erikson led a research team to begin research on the oncogene v-Src. In 1977, Erikson and his research team had a breakthrough. One of the researchers was able to identify the protein associated with v-Src. This protein led to the determination of the pathway Src uses to cause cancer. This pathway is considered to be one of the most important cancer promoting signal cascades. The pathway was not the only discovery in this lab at the time. Another discovery was that the Src was a threonine kinase. A standard methodology at the time was used in the lab to determine this phosphoamino acid.

In 1982, Erikson decided to join the molecular and cellular biology department at Harvard University. While at Harvard, Erikson was recognized for his contributions and discoveries about the v-Src oncogene. Some of the awards he earned included the Lasker Award (1982), the Robert Koch Prize (1982), the Alfred P. Sloan Award (1983), and the Hammer Prize for Cancer Research (1983). After finishing up his research of v-Src, Erikson encouraged his students to look into cell alterations such as morphology, motility and metabolism. One of these downstream alterations occurred in an ERK-MAP pathway. The alteration in this pathway was caused by a Ras oncogene. This discovery led to MEK inhibitors approved by the FDA for cancer treatment. Another downstream alteration discovered was COX2. This pathway led to the inhibition of tyrosine kinases. In cell cycle division, Erikson's lab focused on PLK1 and saw that an increase in PLK1 can lead to carcinogenic cells. Another aspect the lab focused on was RNAi and saw carcinogenic cells with RNAi present division decreased by 80%. Later in his career, Erikson served as the John F. Drum American Cancer Society Professor of Cellular and Developmental Biology.

== Personal life ==
Erikson met his first wife Eleanor (Jo) Erikson while working in a lab under Dr. Waclaw Szybalski. The two divorced after sometime. He later remarried to his second wife Donna. They were married for 32 years until his passing and had a daughter named Amanda.
