= AAPS =

AAPS may refer to:

- Academy of Applied Pharmaceutical Sciences, Toronto, Canada
- American Association of Physician Specialists, certifying physicians with advanced training
- Anglo-Australian Planet Search
- Ann Arbor Public Schools
- Association of American Physicians and Surgeons, a politically conservative organization
- Anglican Adam Preaching Society, an evangelical Christian movement based in Nigeria

== See also ==
- AAP (disambiguation)
- APS (disambiguation)
