= Minko =

Minko may refer to:

- Christopher Minko (born 1956), Australian musician
- Estelle Nze Minko (born 1991), French handball player
- John Minko (born 1953), American radio announcer
- Oleg Minko (1938–2013), Ukrainian painter
- Tamara Minko, professor at Rutgers University
- Valeri Minko (born 1971), Russian footballer
