= Paa =

Paa may refer to:

- Nanorana, a genus of frogs formerly referred to as Paa
- Paa (film), a 2009 Bollywood film
- Paa (given name)

== See also ==
- PAA (disambiguation)
