= Tamara Minko =

Pharmaceutical researcher

Dr. Tamara Minko
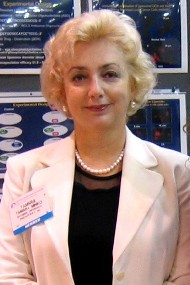
- Medical career
- Profession: Distinguished Professor and Pharmaceutics Department Chair
- Institutions: Rutgers University Ernest Mario School of Pharmacy
- Research: Nanoparticles for medicine delivery

Tamara Minko is a distinguished professor and chair of the department of pharmaceutics at Rutgers University, Ernest Mario School of Pharmacy. She has an H-index of 43 since 2016 and over 17,800 citations of her work.

== Career ==
Minko's scientific career began in Ukraine, but in 1997 she moved to the United States to work with Professor J. Kopecek at the University of Utah. Minko is the chair of the pharmaceutics at Rutgers University. Her research focuses on nanoparticles used to deliver medicine more efficiently to the body, specifically to fight cancer. In 2009, she became the CRS Bioactive Materials Track Program Chair. She was also a member of the board of Scientific Advisors and director-at-large of the Controlled Release Society, Academy of Applied Pharmaceutical Sciences Fellow Research, the Rutgers Cancer Institute of New Jersey, and Environmental and Occupational Health Science Institute.

Minko is a Fellow of American Institute for Medical and Biological Engineering (AIMBE), Controlled Release Society (CRS), and American Association of Pharmaceutical Scientists (AAPS). She is a member of the Study Sections of the Center for Scientific Review at the National Institutes of Health, the Department of Defense, and the American Heart Association. Her research is funded by grants from the National Institutes of Health, the American Lung Association, National Science Foundation, and the Department of Defense among other sources.

== Publications and speaking events ==
Minko is executive editor of Advanced Drug Delivery Reviews and editor of Pharmaceutical Research. She has published in PNAS, Nature Nanotechnology, Cancer Research, Advanced Drug Delivery Reviews, Journal of Controlled Release, Small, and ACS Nano.

Minko has spoken at symposiums and seminars including the Nanomedicine and Drug Delivery Symposium 2008 at Northeastern University, and the Chemistry in Cancer Research from the American Association for Cancer Research and the American Chemical Society in 2009. In 2012 she spoke at the 9th International Conference and Workshop on Biological Barriers 2012. Minko spoke at the Center for Targeted Therapeutics and Translation Nanomedicine Symposium, and the Capital Region Cancer Research New Frontiers Symposium in 2014. In March 2015, she spoke at the Spring Seminar Series at University of Pittsburgh. Minko has also spoken at the New Strategies and Technologies in Cancer Research for Bioconnex and Capital Region Cancer Research Group.
