= St George's Basilica, Victoria =

St George's Basilica
- The Pontifical Collegiate Basilica-Parish Church of Saint George
- Il-Knisja Parrokkjali u Bażilika u Kolleġġjata Lateranensi In Urbe ta' San Ġorġ
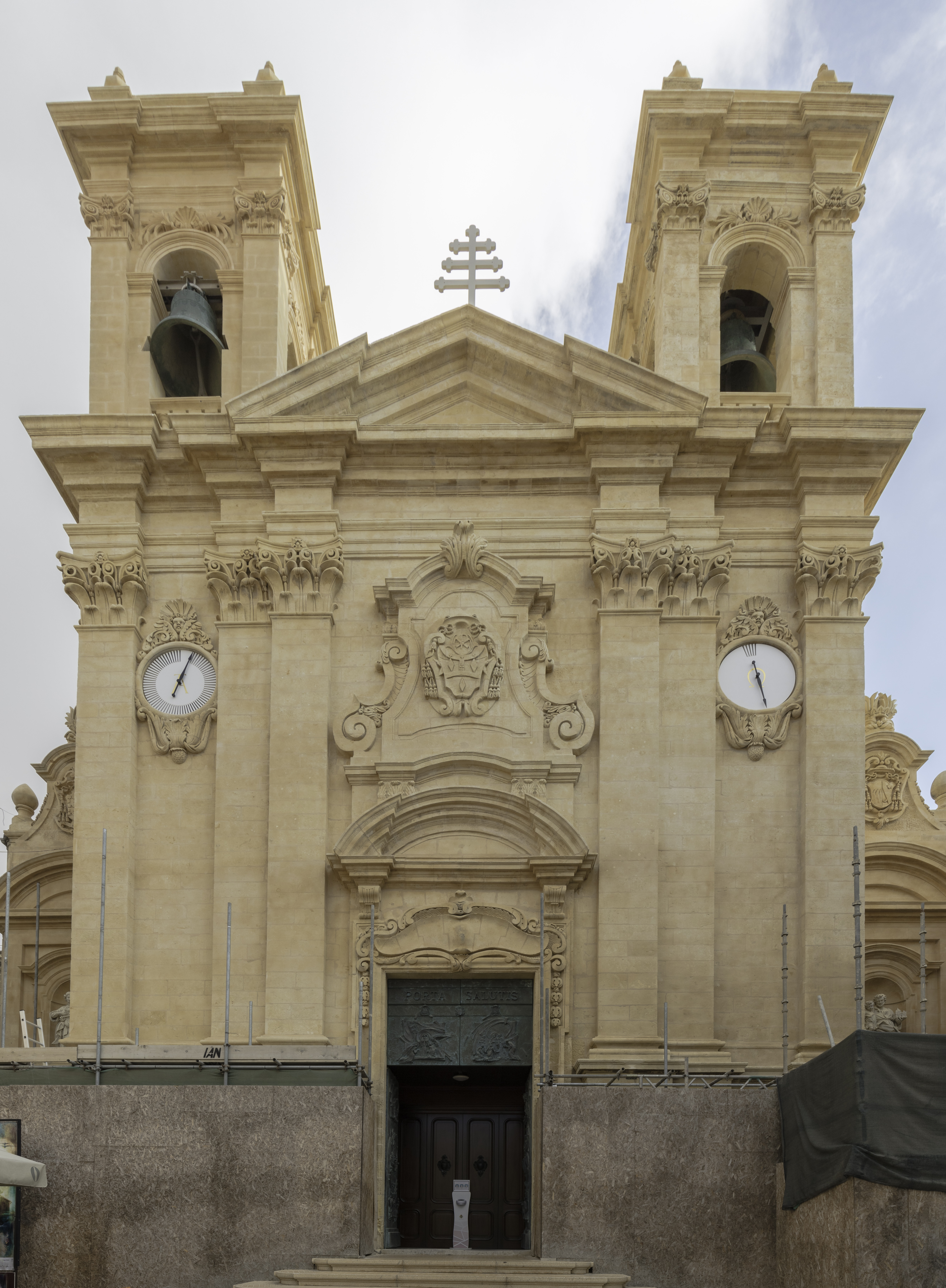
- Exterior of St George's Basilica
- St George's Basilica
- 36°02′38″N 14°14′21″E
- Location: Victoria
- Country: Malta
- Denomination: Roman Catholic
- Website: Website of the basilica

History
- Status: Active
- Founded: Unknown Possibly 4th century (Original parish church); 7 August 1672 (present church)
- Dedication: Saint George
- Consecrated: 21 September 1755
- Events: 6 September 1958 (Became a minor basilica); 8 December 1975 (Became a Pontifical Collegiate church)

Architecture
- Functional status: Collegiate Parish Church
- Heritage designation: Grade 1
- Designated: 2011
- Architect: Vittorio Cassar
- Architectural type: Church
- Style: Baroque
- Years built: 1672–1678
- Groundbreaking: 1672
- Completed: 1678

Specifications
- Materials: Limestone

Administration
- Province: Malta
- Diocese: Gozo
- Deanery: St George's
- Parish: Victoria; Anglican community of Gozo

Clergy
- Bishop: Anton Teuma
- Dean: Anton Teuma
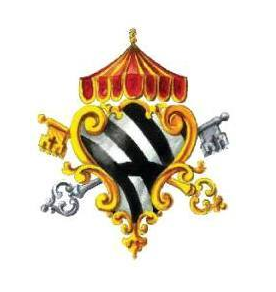

St George's Basilica or the Basilica and Collegiate Parish Church of Saint George, also simply known in Maltese as San Ġorġ (pronounced [sɐn ˈd͡ʒɔrt͡ʃ]), is a historic Baroque church situated in the middle of Gozo, the second largest island in the Maltese archipelago, and is surrounded by a maze of old narrow streets and alleys. The church had been rebuilt numerous times during the Middle Ages. Today's basilica was built between 1672 and 1678.

This is not to be confused with another church by the same name, located in Qormi on the main island, Malta.

== History ==
=== Origin ===
The parish originated in Byzantine times from the time of Emperor Theodosius I in the 4th century. The original church was the main Roman pagan temple of Gozo which had been converted by a Greek missionary into a Christian church dedicated to Saint George. The Roman temple stood at the site of the present church. The church is also documented in manuscript sources in c. 1250, when it is recorded functioning as a parish church. St George's was also listed as one of the parishes in Gozo where indulgences could be obtained on a papal bull by Pope Nicholas V for the Holy Year of 1450. Considering the fact that the parish church originated during the Byzantine period, until 1575, the liturgy in St George's parish church was celebrated in the Byzantine Rite rather than the Latin Rite. It was the last church to celebrate the Byzantine liturgy on the island until the transition to the Roman rite. The church had been rebuilt numerous times during the Middle Ages because of the increasing population of the island. In 1511 a scriptura apostolica declared that the church of St George was the parish church of Gozo, thus covering all the population of Gozo. It is also recorded that the parish priest of St George's church during the half of the 16th century, Reverend Lorenzo de Apapis (1501–1586), was taken prisoner together with most of the inhabitants of the island by the invading Ottomans in 1551 to Constantinople. Reverend De Apapis managed to buy his freedom some years later and returned to Gozo and rebuilt the church of St George which had been badly damaged. Likewise the church was reconstructed again in 1583 and 1598.

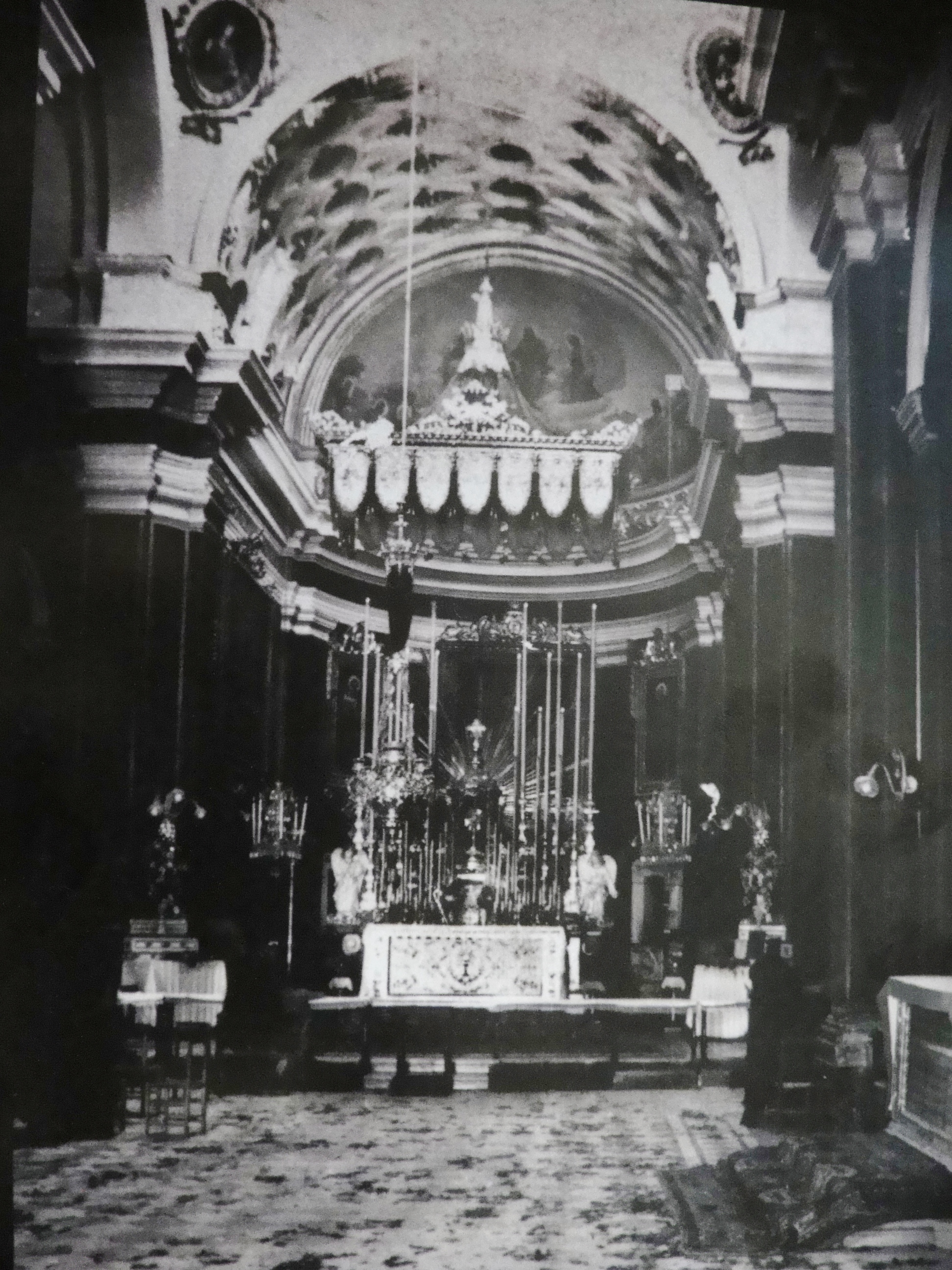
Interior of St George's in the 1930s

=== Present church ===
The present church was planned by Vittorio Cassar when he also demolished the buildings that could serve to cover an enemy attack on the town of Gozo today called the Cittadella. The foundation stone of the present church was laid on 7 August 1672. The church's construction was completed by in 1678 and it was consecrated on 21 September 1755 by Bishop Paul Alphéran de Bussan.

=== The union of the two parishes ===
In 1630 the vicar general of the Diocese of Malta, Pier Francesco Pontremoli, proposed the union of the two parishes of Gozo – that of the Assumption in the Citadella and that of St George – because of conflicts and competitions that the two parish priests of the respective parishes where initiating. In the meantime the parish church of St George was rebuilt and finished in 1678. It was on 28 April 1688, that Bishop Davide Cocco Palmieri created from the Matrix church dedicated to the Assumption of Mary in the old town of Gozo four new parishes in Gozo and joined the parish of St George with its Matrix church. This union went on for the next 266 years until 1 August 1955, when the Bishop of Gozo, Giuseppe Pace, dissolved this union between the two parishes by signing the decree Cum hodiernis temporibus in which he established St George as a new parish independent from its mother church, the Gozo Cathedral. Thus St George started carrying once again its pastoral activities.

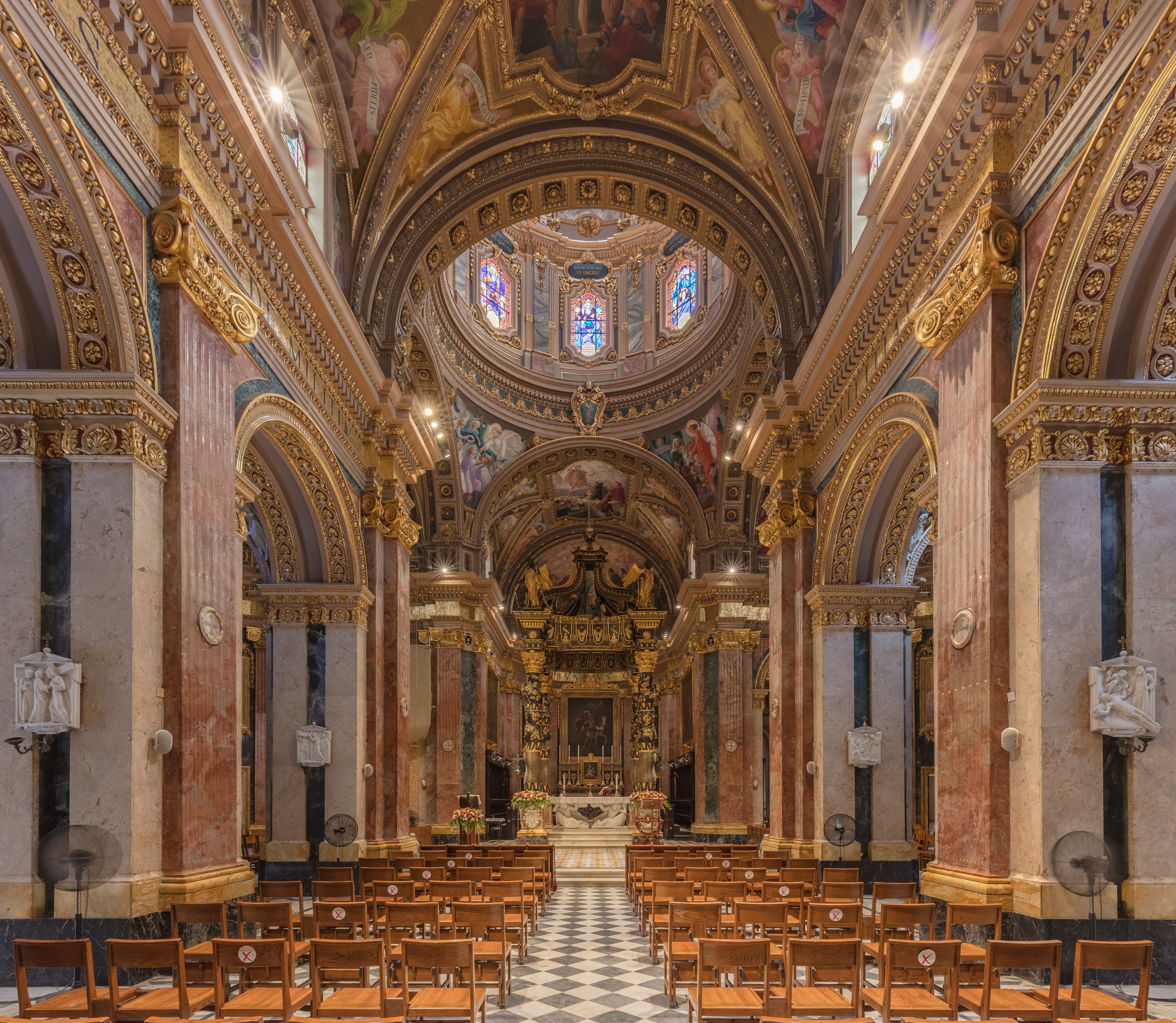
The interior of the basilica

=== New façade ===
The first major architectural modification to the church, after it was rebuilt, took place in 1818 when the church façade was rebuilt due to damage suffered by an earthquake that hit Gozo on 1 February 1697, 20 years after the church was completed. The designed for the façade were made by Salvatore Bondi.

=== Religious Order ===
In 1880 the associate priest here was Joseph Diacono and under his leadership the Franciscan Sisters of the Heart of Jesus was formed here. In time, Diacono wanted to end the organisation but local Religious Virginia De Brincat disagreed and she became the Superior General. She is now the Venerable Madre Margerita De Brincat.

=== Enlargement ===
In the 1930s the church was enlarged with the addition of the naves and the side chapels. Between 1939 and 1940 the dome of the church was reconstructed due to damage done in the earthquakes of 1693 and 1789. The roof was also rebuilt and reconstructed in the Roman style arch between 1938 and 1939. The inauguration of the enlarged church took place on 28 July 1940, by Bishop Mikiel Gonzi.

=== Minor basilica ===
On 6 September 1958 Archpriest Cefai announced to the gathered congregation that the church was honoured with the title of Basilica. The decree, Merito dilaudatur templum, dated 6 September 1958, confirmed Pope Pius XII's decision that the parish church was now a Basilica. With this title the church received certain privileges such as precedence before other churches, the right of the Umbraculum and the Tintinnabulum.

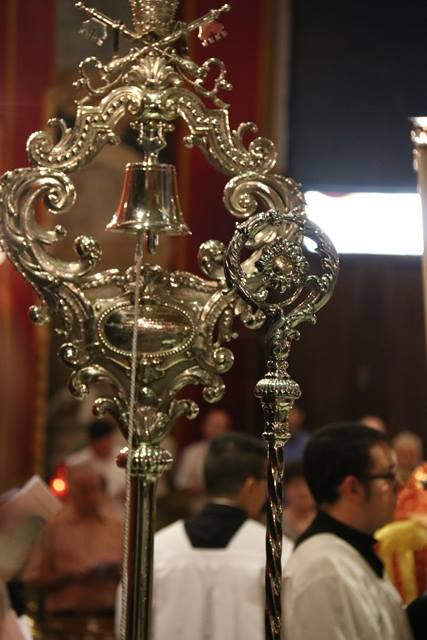
The Tintinnabulum of the basilica (1958) and the bishop's Crosier who is also the dean of the collegiate chapter.

These objects are carried in every procession that the collegiate chapter takes part in. Also the church acquired the right to include the papal symbol of the crossed keys on a basilica's banners, furnishings and seal.

=== Collegiate church ===
On 8 December 1975, Bishop Nikol Joseph Cauchi established the first collegiate chapter of the new Pontifical Collegiate church. He decreed that the Collegiate church would be aggregated to the Cathedral Archbasilica of St. John Lateran of Rome. In total Gozo has five collegiate chapters all with their peculiar privileges and insignia. The peculiarity of this Collegiate church consists in that it is the only Collegiate Chapter that has not yet been confirmed by the Holy See.

The church building is listed on the National Inventory of the Cultural Property of the Maltese Islands.

== Works of art ==
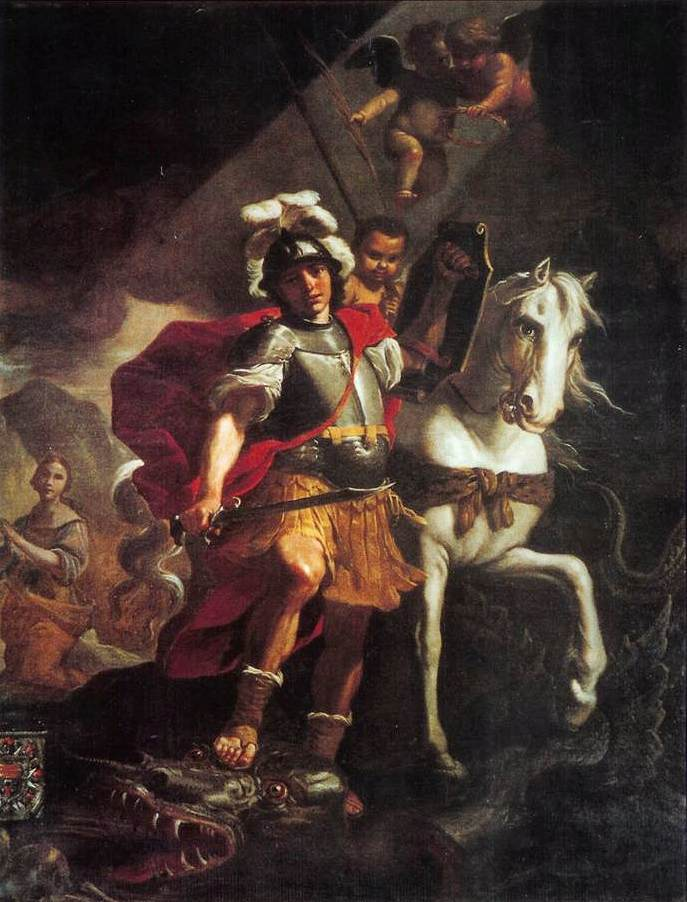
Titular Painting by Mattia Preti (1678).

The first view of the basilica's interior is one exquisite architectural proportion and harmony. This parish church is referred to as "the golden church" of Gozo. It is entirely covered with marble and gold stucco. The church houses two works of art by the famous painter Mattia Preti. These are the main altar piece representing St George with the dragon and the other in a side chapel representing the Holy Souls.

=== Titular altarpiece ===
In 1678 the governor of Gozo Don Francesco de Corduba commissioned a new altarpiece for the parish church of St George from Preti. This painting is considered to be one of Gozo's most important painting. The painting depicts St George triumphant over the dragon. The coat of arms of the donor is depicted in the bottom left corner of the painting.

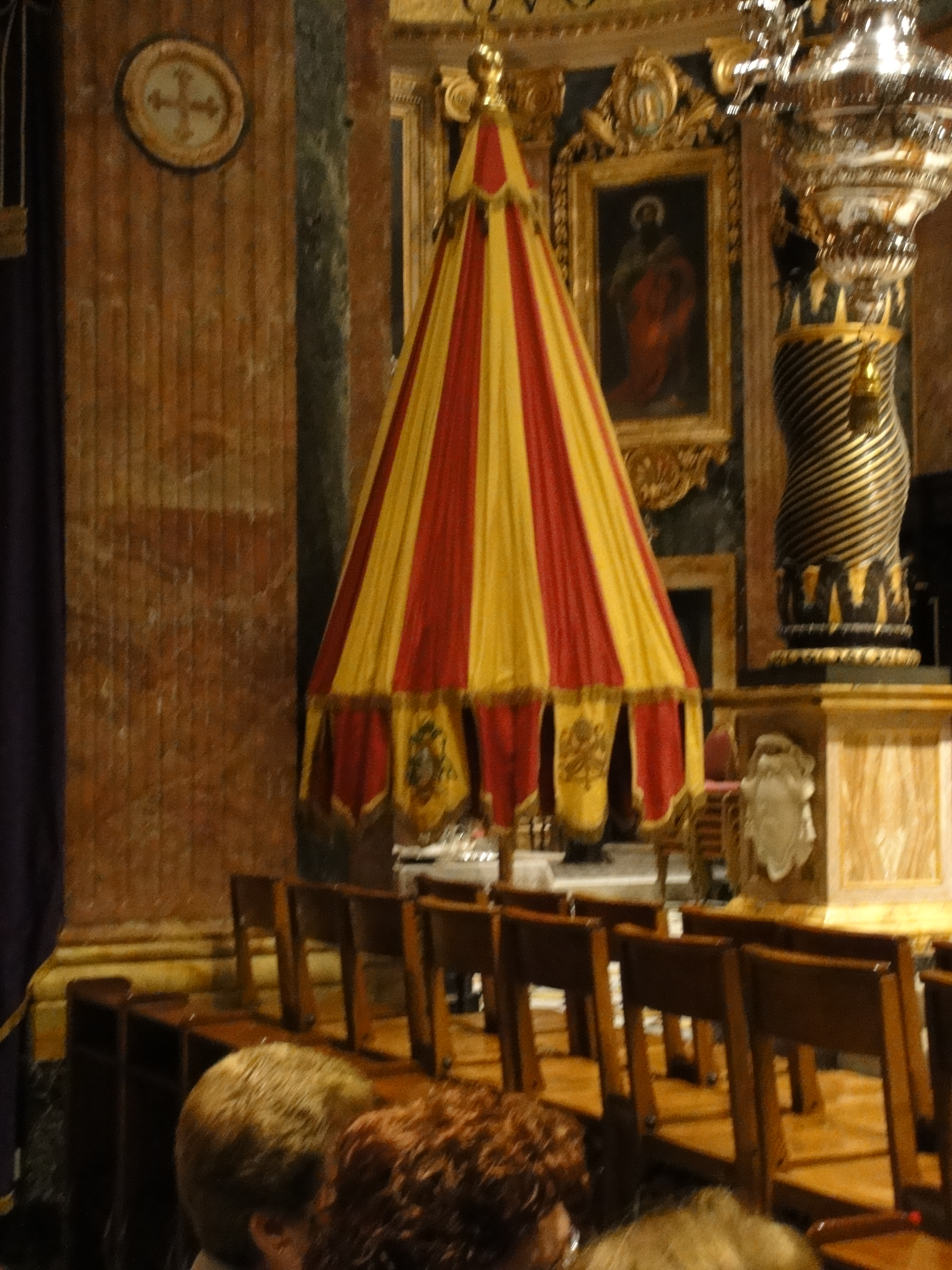
The Umbraculum of the basilica (1958)

=== Side chapels ===
The basilica has a total of 11 side chapels. Starting from the left side of the basilica when entering the main door one finds the chapel of St Paul with a baroque altar and a painting depicting St Paul and the Immaculate Conception by Stefano Erardi (1699). Next, is the side entrance chapel of St Alphonsus Maria de' Liguori which does not contain an altar though has an oval oil canvas depicting the saint by Maltese painter Ramiro Cali commissioned in 1925. Next, is the chapel of St Michael the Archangel who is depicted in a mosaic made in Rome in 1963 based on an older painting now located in the basilica museum. The next chapel contains a baroque altar designed by Francesco Zahra and produced between 1759 and 1761 by Giovanni Antonio Durante. The chapel is dedicated to the Holy Souls in purgatory and has a painting done by Preti. The last chapel on the left is dedicated to Jesus and Mary. It contains a painting by Alession Erardi depicting Christ the Saviour and the Virgin with St Ignatius of Loyola and St Francis Xavier (1723). This chapel also contains a wooden statue of Jesus and Mary done by Sigismondo Dimech between 1802 and 1807.

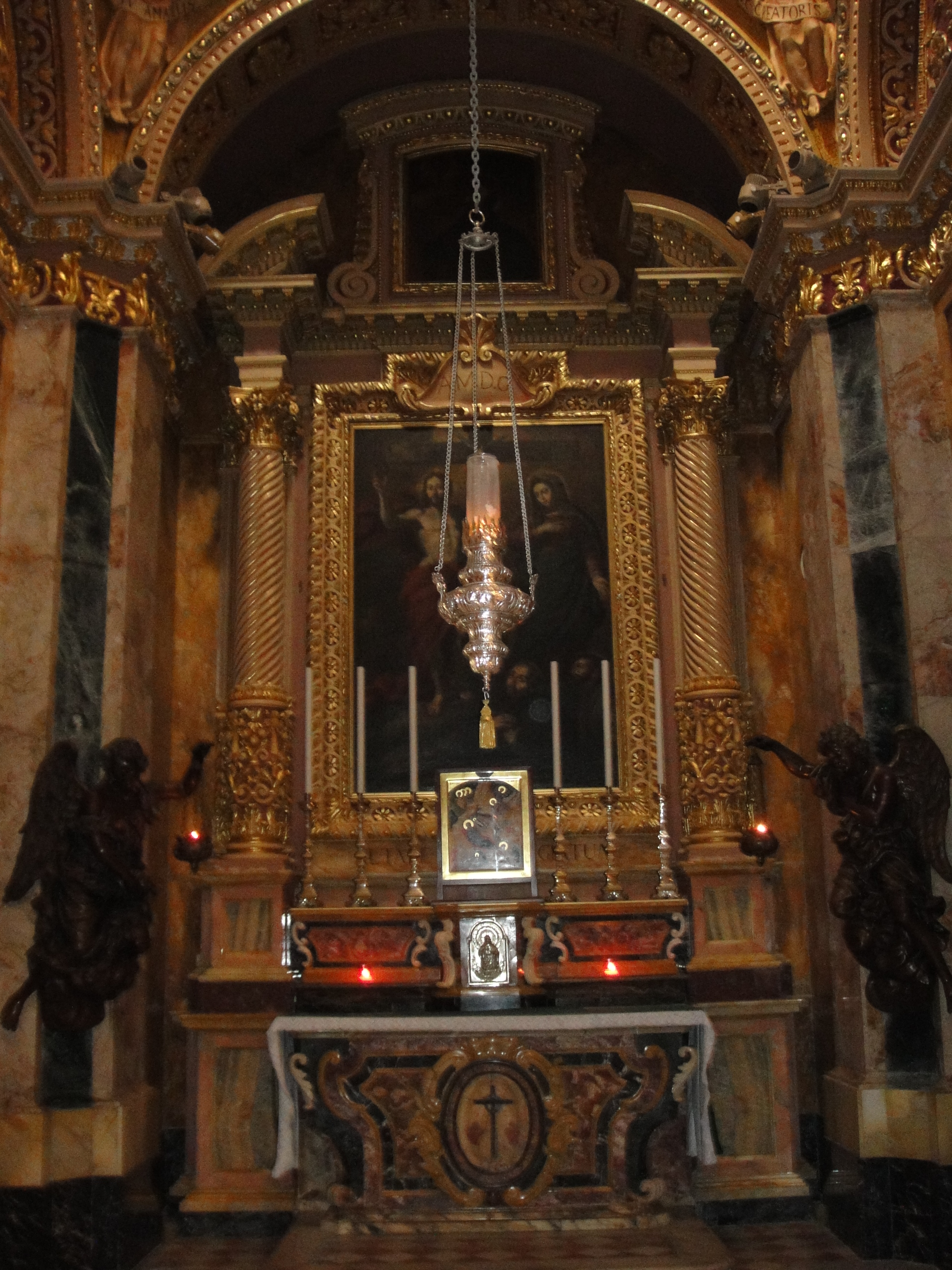
Chapel of Mary and Jesus

On the other side starting from the right hand side of the choir is the Neo-Byzantine chapel of the Holy Cross and the Blessed Sacrament. Next is the chapel of Saint Cajetan which, up to some years ago, prior to the building of the Neo-Byzantine chapel, contained the altar of the Holy Cross. This chapel also houses the titular statue of St George (1839) and the statue of the Resurrected Christ (1996). The painting depicting St Cajetan was removed and is now housed in the basilica museum. Next is the chapel of St Lazarus which contains a painting of the resurrection of Lazarus by Giuseppe D'Arena and a baroque altar containing the corpse of St Clement. The following chapel is dedicated to St Joseph and contains a baroque altar and a painting by Giuseppe Cali depicting the Holy Family (1899). The next chapel is an entrance chapel with no altar and is dedicated to St Thérèse of Lisieux and contains a small oval oil canvas depicting the saint by Ramiro Cali. The last chapel is dedicated to St Catherine of Alexandria and contains a baroque altar with a painting depicting the Mystic Marriage of St Catherine by Giuseppe D'Arena.

=== Interior renovation ===
Between 1945 and 1954 the church underwent major changes that changed its internal appearance. In 1945 work started on the decoration of the cupola of the church. The paintings in the cupola represent the theme of victory from the Book of Revelation. They were painted by Giovanni Battista Conti while the stucco decoration was done by Giuseppe Galea. Conti also designed 8 stained glass windows which decorate the dome. The dome was inaugurated in 1949. That same year a new set of Stations of the Cross, carved from marble and brought from Rome, were inaugurated. They were designed by Carlo Pisi and sculpted by Henreaux of Lucca. In 1952 work started on the decoration of the naves while the newly redecorated organ gallery was finished.

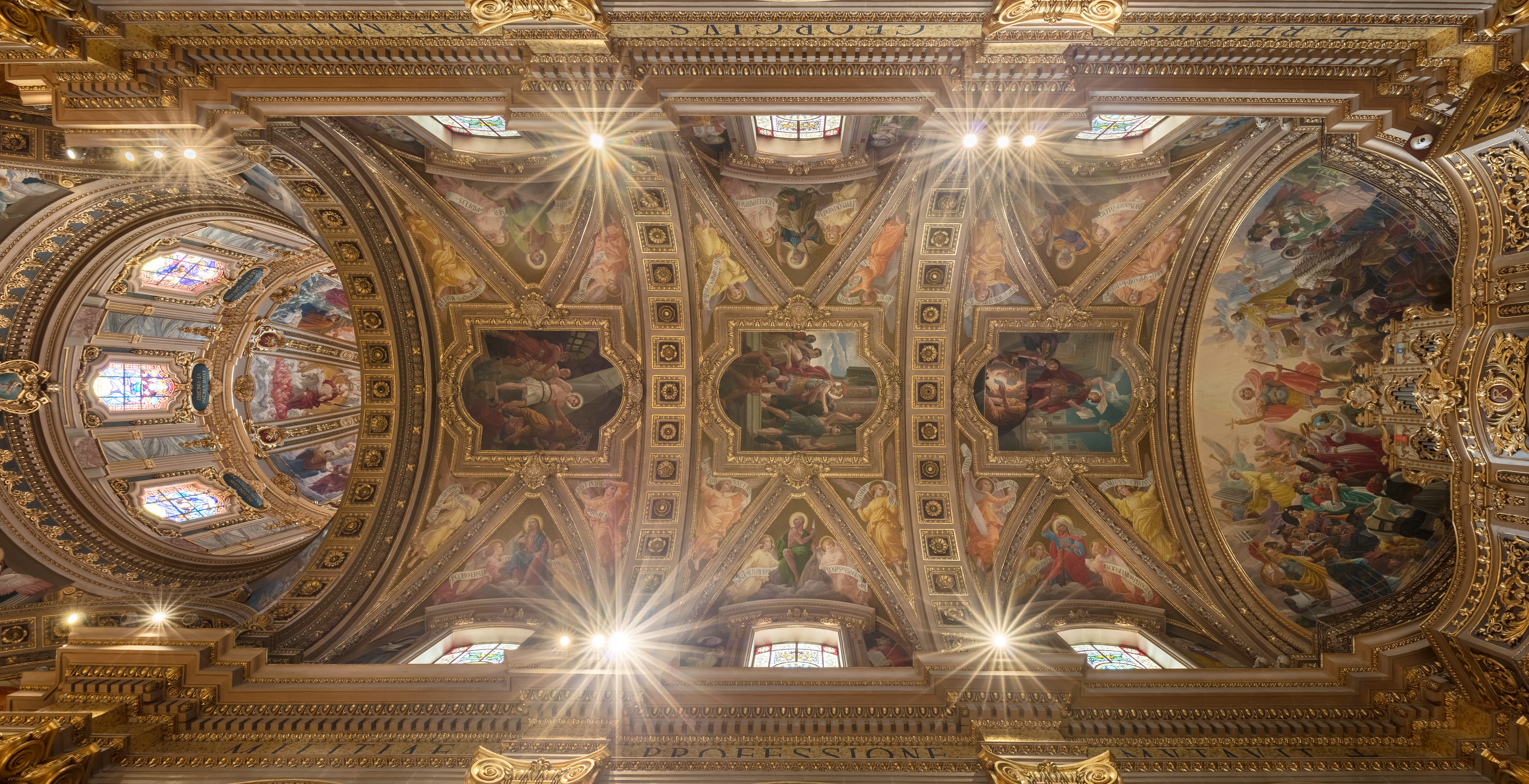
Ceiling of the basilica

Mattia Preti, Giuseppe Calì, Michele Busuttil, Giuseppe Fenech, Francesco V. Zahra, Fortunato Venuti, Injazju Cortis, Ramiro Calì, Filippo Cosimo, Giuseppe D'Arena, Salvatore Bondì, Robert Dingli, Stefano Erardi, Alessio Erardi and Alfred Camilleri Cauchi are other famous artists whose works can be admired in the basilica and its annexes. The church also possesses the whole corpse of St Clement lying inside one of the side altars.

=== Baroque high altar ===
The baroque high altar that had graced St George's since 1755 was dismantled and replaced in 1960. Following the elevation of the church to a minor basilica which gave rise to the decision to replace the baroque altar with a new papal altar. The baroque altar had been sculpted by Claudio Durante of Valletta on designs by Francesco Zahra (1710–1773). The altar contained six types of marble all quarried from Sicily. When the altar was dismantled, its parts disappeared until rediscovered again in 1999. The altar was fully restored in 2011 and was formally inaugurated and exhibited in Valletta at the Istituto Italiano di Cultura.

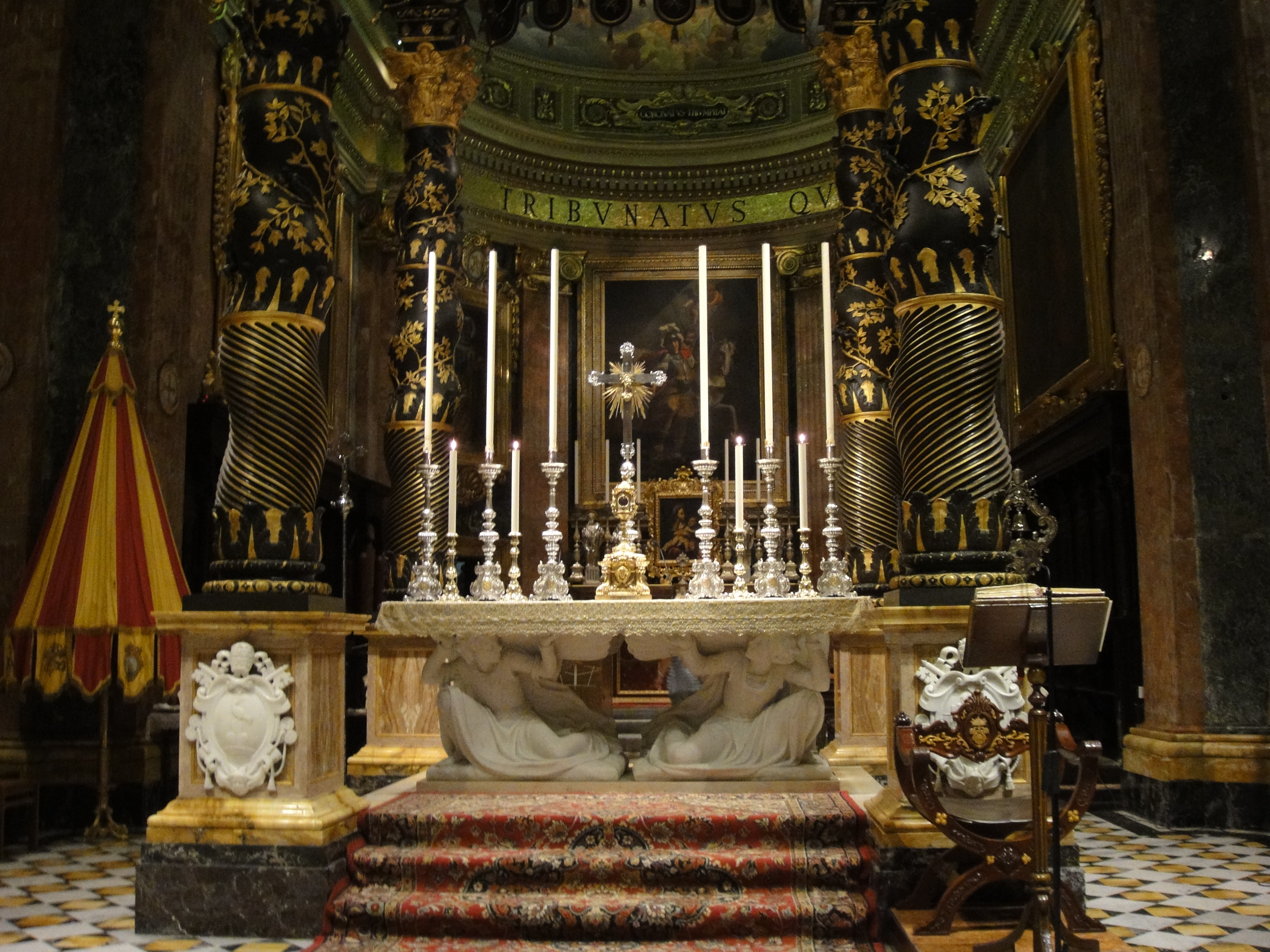
The 1960 high altar of the basilica.

=== New high altar and canopy ===
In 1960 a new main altar was dedicated. It was made from white Carrara marble on the design of Carlo Pisi. The altar depicts four angels wearing clerical vestments on their knees while lifting the horizontal piece of the altar on their shoulders. This was the first altar table in Gozo to be dedicated in any church. The bronze and gold gilded canopy over the high altar is indeed impressive. It was made in 1967 following the liturgical reform promulgated by the Second Vatican Council. The canopy was based on the design of Bernini's in St Peter's Rome.

=== Titular statue ===
But the main attraction is the wooden statue of the patron saint, St George, sculpted in wood by Pietru Pawl Azzopardi in 1839. It was the first titular statue acquired by a parish church in Gozo. According to uninterrupted tradition, the statue was commissioned as an ex-voto. The statue underwent significant restoration in 1903 and 1996. The statue is located on the right hand side of the chapel of Saint Cajetan.

=== Medieval ciborium ===
In 1816, during demolition and reconstruction works on the façade of the basilica, a very old ciborium, belonging to St George's parish church, was discovered hidden in the walls of the church. The ciborium dates from Medieval times (12th century) and is mentioned in various manuscripts and records about the parish church. Today the ciborium is kept at the Gozo Cathedral Museum.

=== Byzantine chapel ===
Something which one may not expect to see in a traditionally classic Baroque building, such as St George's, is a Byzantine style chapel. The cornerstone was laid in 2002. Today this chapel holds the Blessed Sacrament and the Holy Cross of the basilica. In 2004 work started on the building of the new dome of the chapel. The chapel was blessed by the then Archpriest Dr Joseph Farrugia on 10 July 2005. This unusual style was chosen for its cultural association with the Christian Churches of the East. The aim was to help instil in the Catholic faithful the awareness that the universal Church breathes through two lungs, that of the Western Church as well as that of the Eastern-rite sui-iuris Catholic Churches in communion with Rome. The chapel and the dome were built to the designs of Vince Centorrino. The dome includes eight Byzantine style windows and is to be decorated with gold mosaic. The floor of the chapel is covered with porphyry slabs. The chapel also includes a solid silver tabernacle, seven feet tall. It was built in the form of the ancient ciborium that was in use in St George's up to the sixteenth century when it was lost but retrieved again when it was found buried in the old façade of the basilica, some two centuries later.

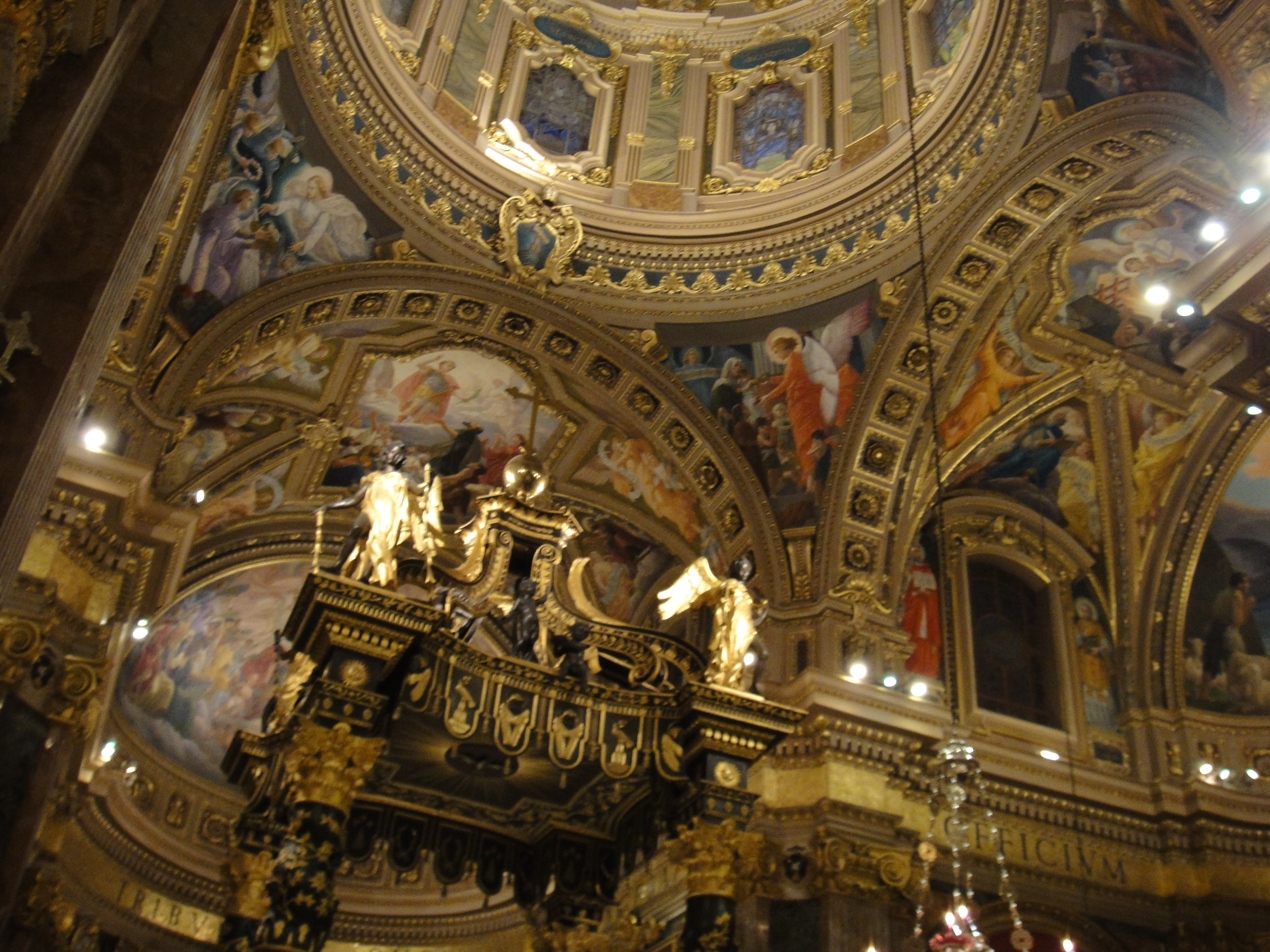

=== Bronze door ===
In 2004 the new main door of the basilica was inaugurated by Bishop Nikol Joseph Cauchi. The door, named Porta Salutis, is made entirely of bronze and was manufactured in Verona on a design by John Grima. The door features a total of eight designs, with the coat of arms of Pope John Paul II in the middle since it was during his pontificate that door was inaugurated. The bronze door is the only one in the entire island of Gozo.

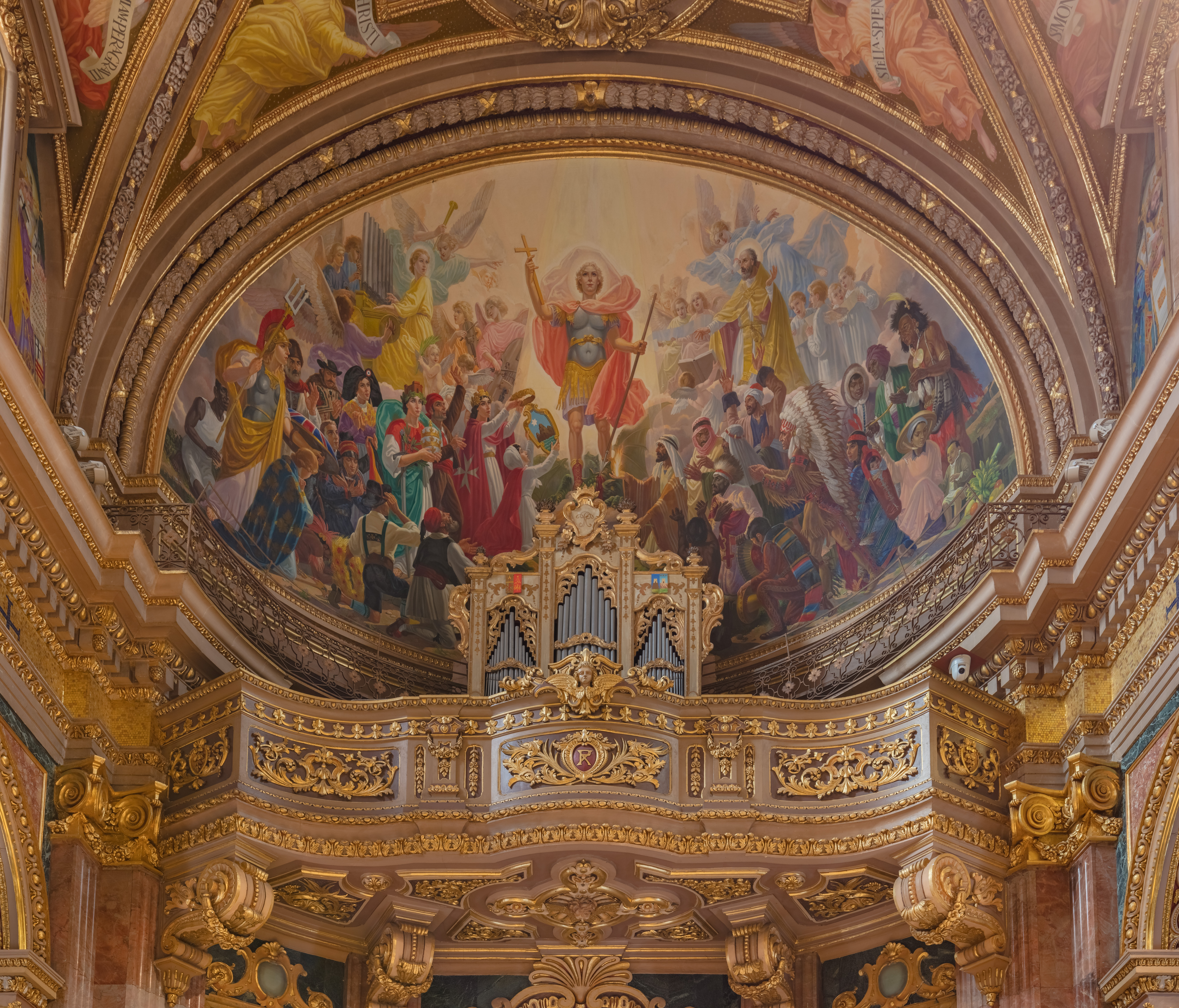
Balcony, pipe organ and fresco

=== Basilica pipe organ ===
St George's Basilica's first organ was first introduced towards the late 17th or early 18th century, after the parish church had been rebuilt in the size and shape that it largely is today. With the organ, built by Santucci from Sicily in 1781 and installed high above the West door, a tradition of organ music was launched which continues to this day. Later a small portable organ joined the Baroque one for daily Church services.

The old Baroque organ fell silent in the mid-1960s and remained in disuse for a number of years. Its place, and that of the smaller one, had been taken by a large portable electronic organ. Then, in the late 1990s, through the initiatives of Reverend George J. Frendo and Reverend Joseph Mercieca, the old organ was professionally restored in Italy by Piero Piccioni and a digital functioning new organ replaced the electronic one. As a consequence, the basilica now had the renewed availability of a fully functional Baroque organ which could be played from the gallery or from the console behind the main altar, and, beside it, a full digital organ that could be played individually or in conjunction with the old pipe organ.

In 2004 a new pipe organ, dating from the 19th century, was donated to St George's Basilica by Dr Richard Vendome, an Oxford music scholar and the Oxford Girls' Choir organist and founder. The organ was formerly housed in a Methodist assembly hall in the UK. The organ was installed in St Michael's Hall and inaugurated in 2006.

== Events and services ==
The basilica is the host of various events such as:

=== Feast of St George ===
The liturgical feast of St George Martyr, protector of the island of Gozo and patron saint of the city, falls on 23 April, but external festivities are celebrated with great pomp in the city during the week leading to the third Sunday of July.

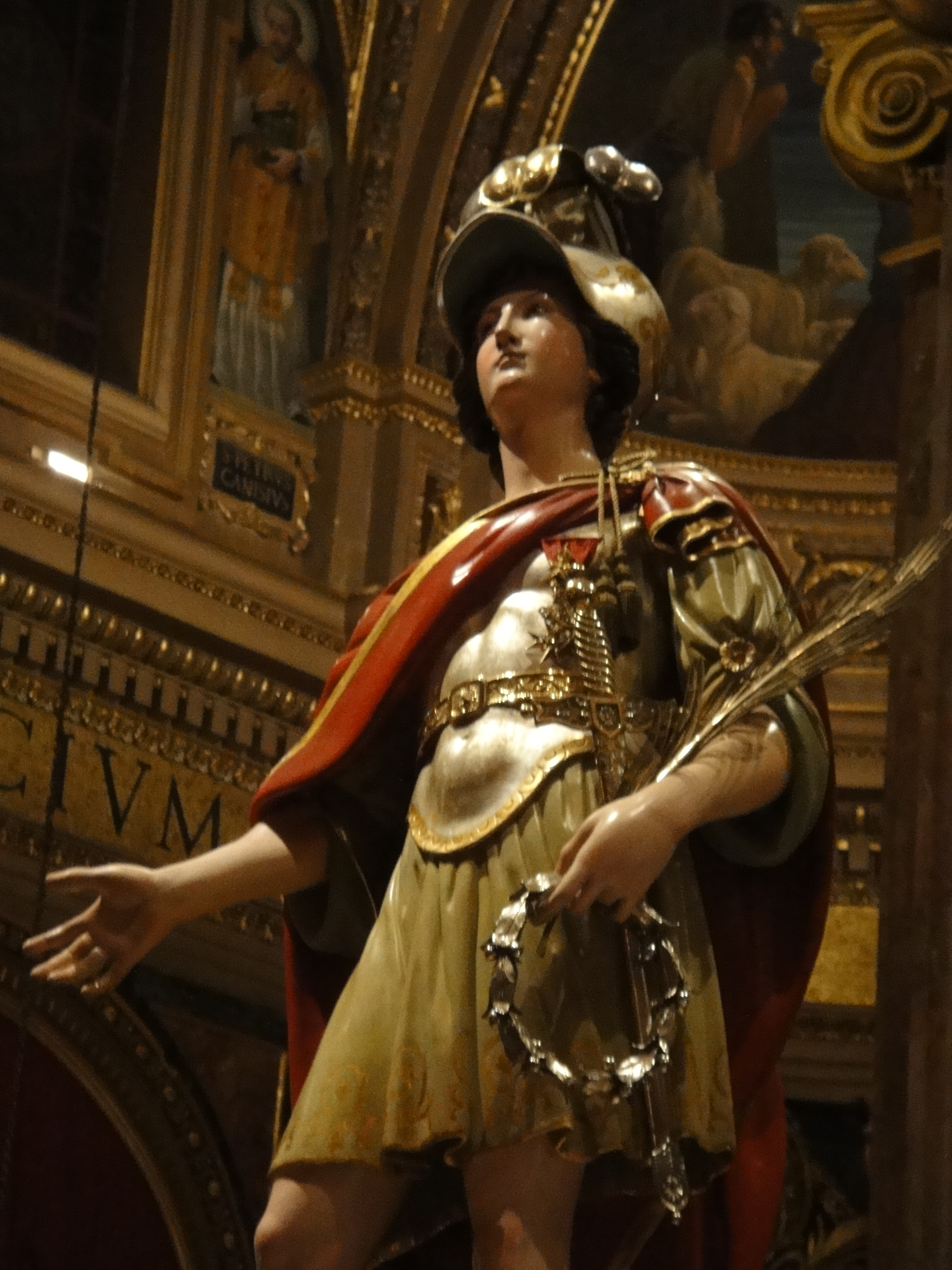
Titular statue of St George by Pietru Pawl Azzopardi (1839)

=== Victoria International Arts Festival ===
The basilica also hosts five weeks of cultural events from mid June until mid July. The Victoria International Arts Festival is a non-profit organisation that makes these events possible. All concerts and events are free of charge.

=== Religious services ===
But first and foremost the basilica is a place of worship. Services start as early as 5.15 am on Weekdays and at 5.00 am on Sundays. Services are celebrated at frequent intervals throughout the morning and in the evening and people come from all over the island knowing that St George's basilica is always open to welcome them. The basilica is considered to be the busiest parish on the island. In December the basilica celebrates the Christmas novena, which are nine days of festivities that lead to the feast of Christmas. The Christmas Midnight Mass is attended by hundreds of faithful from all over the country to the extent where there is no more space for people to fit inside the church. Another novena is celebrated in preparation for the feast of the patron Saint George which also draws many people through doors of the basilica.

=== Basilica museum ===
In February 2013 the basilica opened the doors to its new modern museum, one of a kind in the country. It is the first building built for the purpose of a museum. The museum and cultural centre, named as Heart of Gozo: Il-Hagar, displays a rich collection of historical and artistic artefacts previously inaccessible to the general public. The museum also hosts cultural events from time to time and also exhibits temporary exhibitions. The museum is found on the left side of the basilica. The curator of the museum is the Rev. Mgr. Dr. Joseph Farrugia, Archpriest emeritus of the basilica.

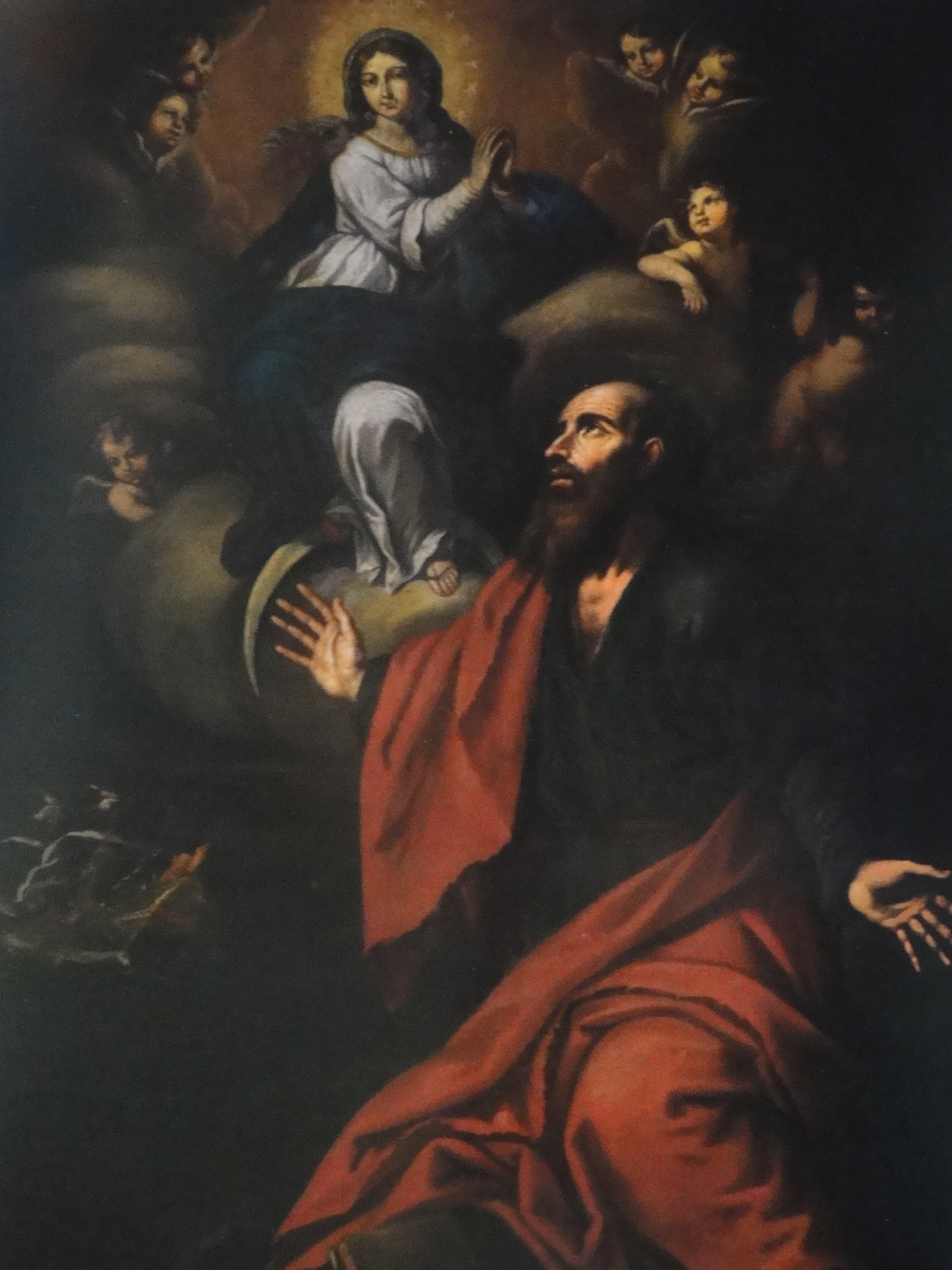
The Immaculate Conception with St Paul (1699) by Stefano Erardi

=== Sistine Chapel Choir ===
The basilica was also the place where various world-famous choirs performed, among these one can mention the Sistine Chapel Choir who performed a concert of sacred music. The first time the choir visited the basilica was in 2006, when on 23 April, the liturgical feast of St George, the choir sang works by Palestrina, Victoria, Perosi, Bartolucci, and Liberto. The second time the choir visited the church was on 23 February 2013, as part of the celebrations of the opening of the new museum, Heart of Gozo: Il-Hagar. Interesting to note is that this was the last time that the Sistine Chapel Choir sang during the pontificate of Pope Benedict XVI, who resigned five days later. The choir performed a concert of sacred music for the third time on 7 June 2017. The basilica is also privileged to be the only church on the island of Gozo where the papal choir has ever performed.

=== Anglican Community of the Blessed Virgin and St George ===
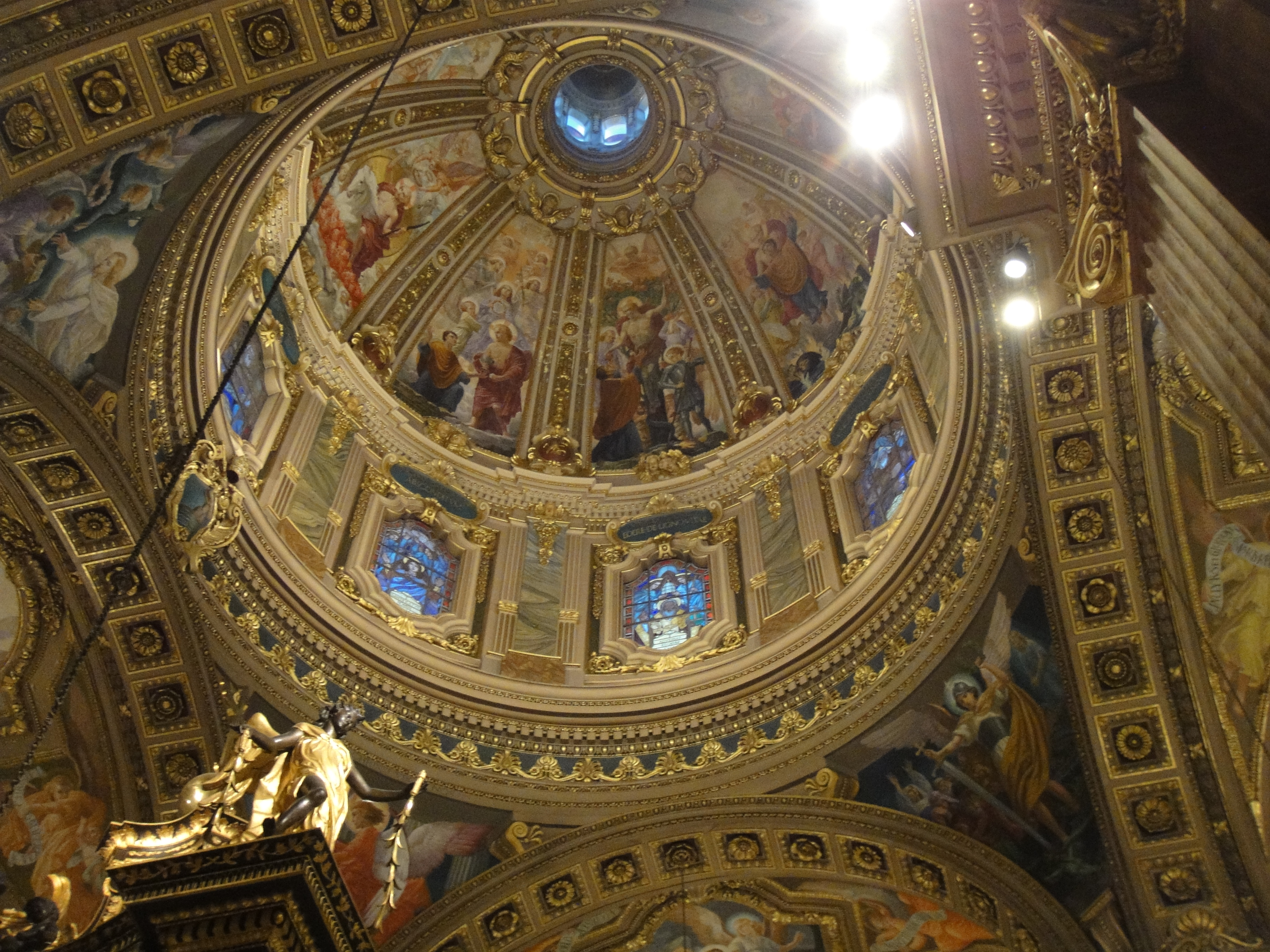
The dome paintings by Gian Battista Conti.

Apart from being a Roman Catholic parish church, the basilica also serves as the main parish church of the Anglican community of Gozo, part of the Diocese of Europe. The community, dedicated to the Blessed Virgin and St George, was established in St George's Basilica on 23 April 2005, in a Eucharist celebrated by Canon Tom Mendel, the then Chancellor of St Paul's Pro-Cathedral in Valletta on behalf of Geoffrey Rowell, bishop of the Diocese of Europe. The Anglican community frequently participates in ecumenical services in the basilica and frequently celebrates important services in the same basilica such as the feast of St George on 23 April.

== Important dates ==
- 23 April: Solemnity of Saint George
- 6 September: Anniversary of the elevation of the church as a Basilica
- 14 September: Feast of the Exaltation of the Holy Cross
- 22 September: Anniversary of the Dedication of the church
- 29 September: Feast of Saint Michael
- 9 November: Solemnity of the Dedication of the Archbasilica of St. John Lateran
- 8 December: Anniversary of the establishment of the Collegiate chapter
- 27 December: Solemnity of Saint John the Evangelist
- 31 December: Solemnity of Saint Sylvester I

== Recent archpriests ==
From 1688 until 1975 there was only one archpriest for the two parishes of Victoria. This was because of the union of the two parishes that took place in 1688. Thus the priest in charge was known as the Archpriest of Victoria or Rabat. The first Archpriest of St George, since 1688, was Emmanuel Mercieca, who became archpriest in 1975 upon the death of his predecessor Michael Cefai who was the last Archpriest of Victoria.

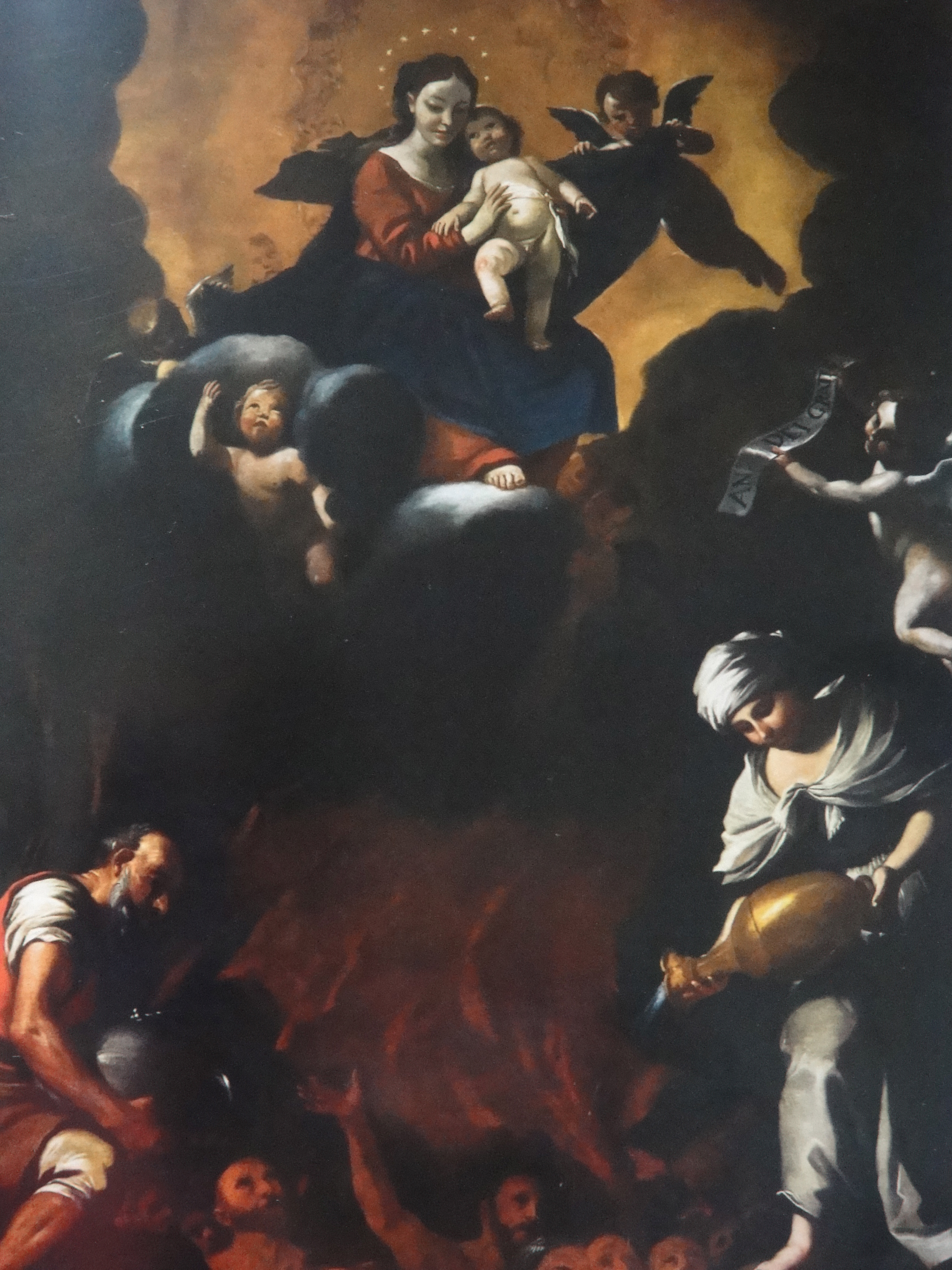
The Virgin of Mercy with Holy Souls in Purgatory by Mattia Preti (1686–1688).

- Rev. Mgr Joseph Curmi (2016–present)
- Rev. Mgr Paul Cardona (2007–2016)
- Rev. Mgr Dr Joseph Farrugia (1998–2007)
- Rev. Mgr Salv Borg (1986–1998)
- Rev. Mgr Emmanuel Mercieca (1975–1986)
- Rev. Mgr Michael Cefai (1944–1975)
- Rev. Mgr Alfons Maria Hili (1917–1944)
- Rev. Mgr Feliċ Refalo (until 1917)

== Collegiate chapter ==
On 8 December 1975, Bishop Nikol Joseph Cauchi established the first collegiate chapter of canons of St George's. The present chapter has a total of 13 members.

- Most Rev. Mgr Anton Teuma – Diocesan Bishop and Dean
- Very Rev. Mgr Joseph Curmi – Archpriest
- Very Rev. Mgr Dr Joseph Farrugia – Archpriest Emeritus
- Rev. Mgr Felix Tabone – Chancellor
- Rev. Can. Giovanni Gauci
- Rev. Can. Joseph A. Borg
- Rev. Can. George DeBrincat
- Rev. Can. George J. Frendo
- Rev. Can. Emanuel Buttigieg
- Rev. Can. Dr Joe Zammit
- Rev. Can. Geoffrey G. Attard
- Rev. Can. Richard N. Farrugia

== Gallery ==
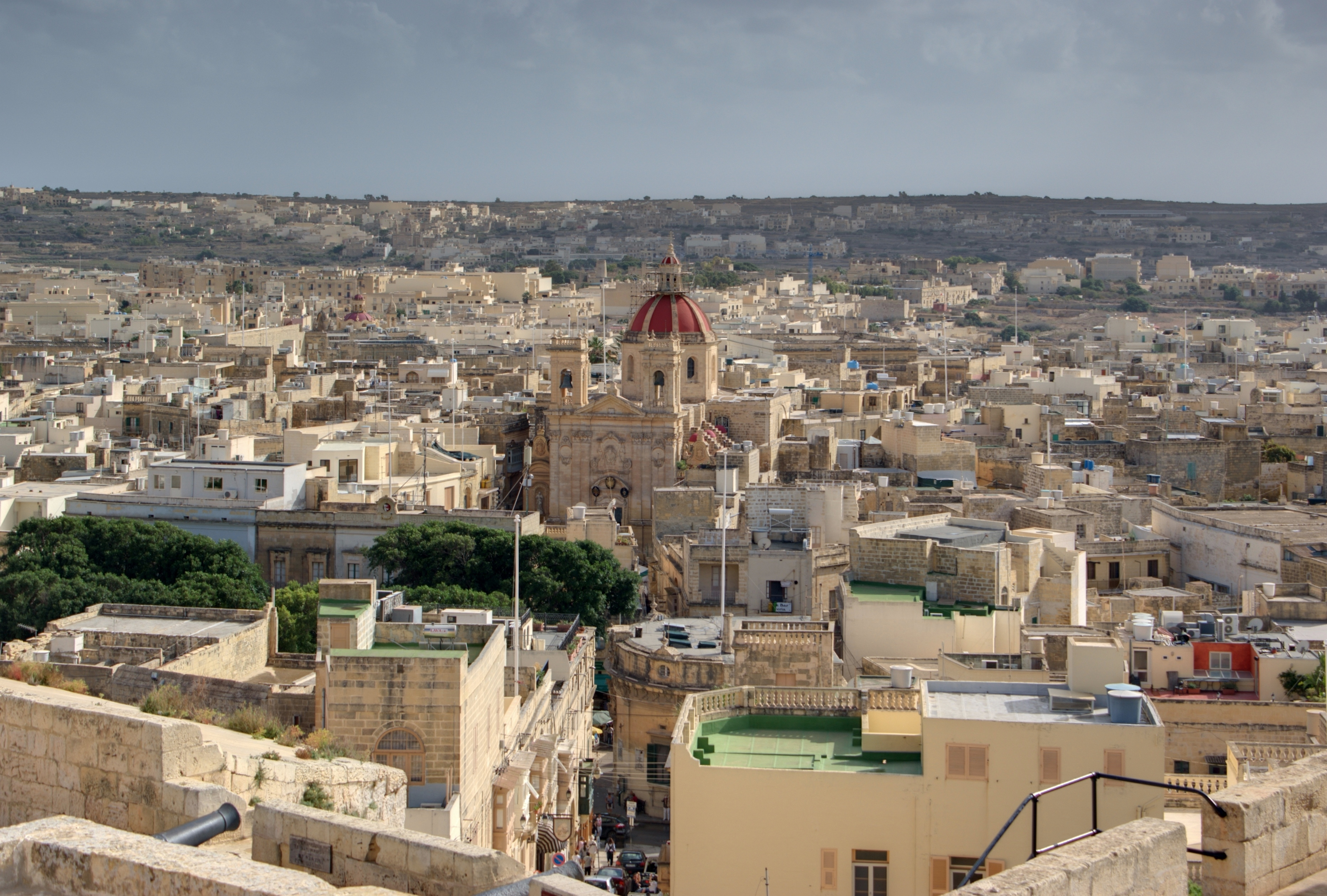
View of St George's from the Citadel.

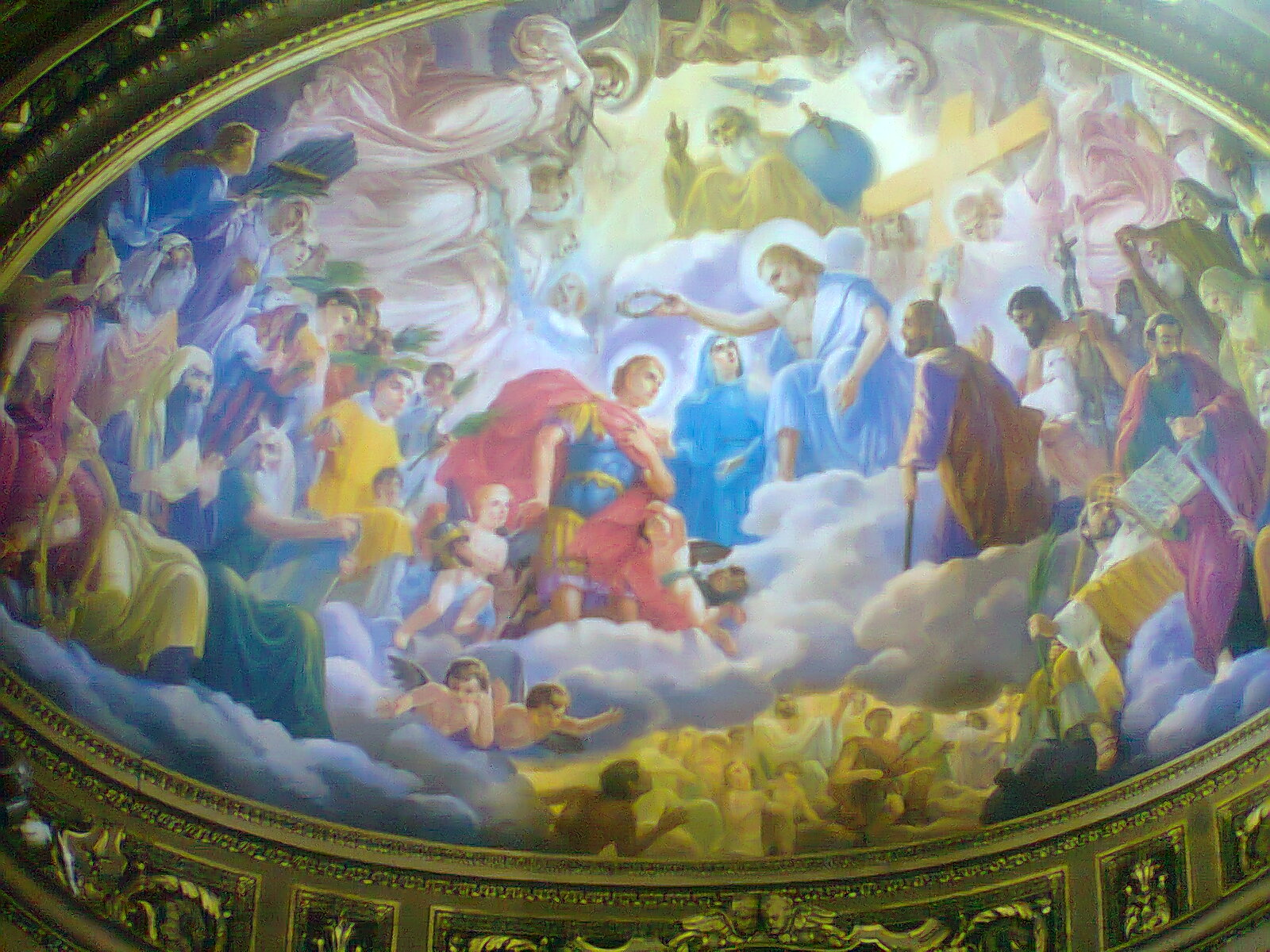
St George in glory by Giovanni Battista Conti situated in the apse of the basilica completed in 1955.

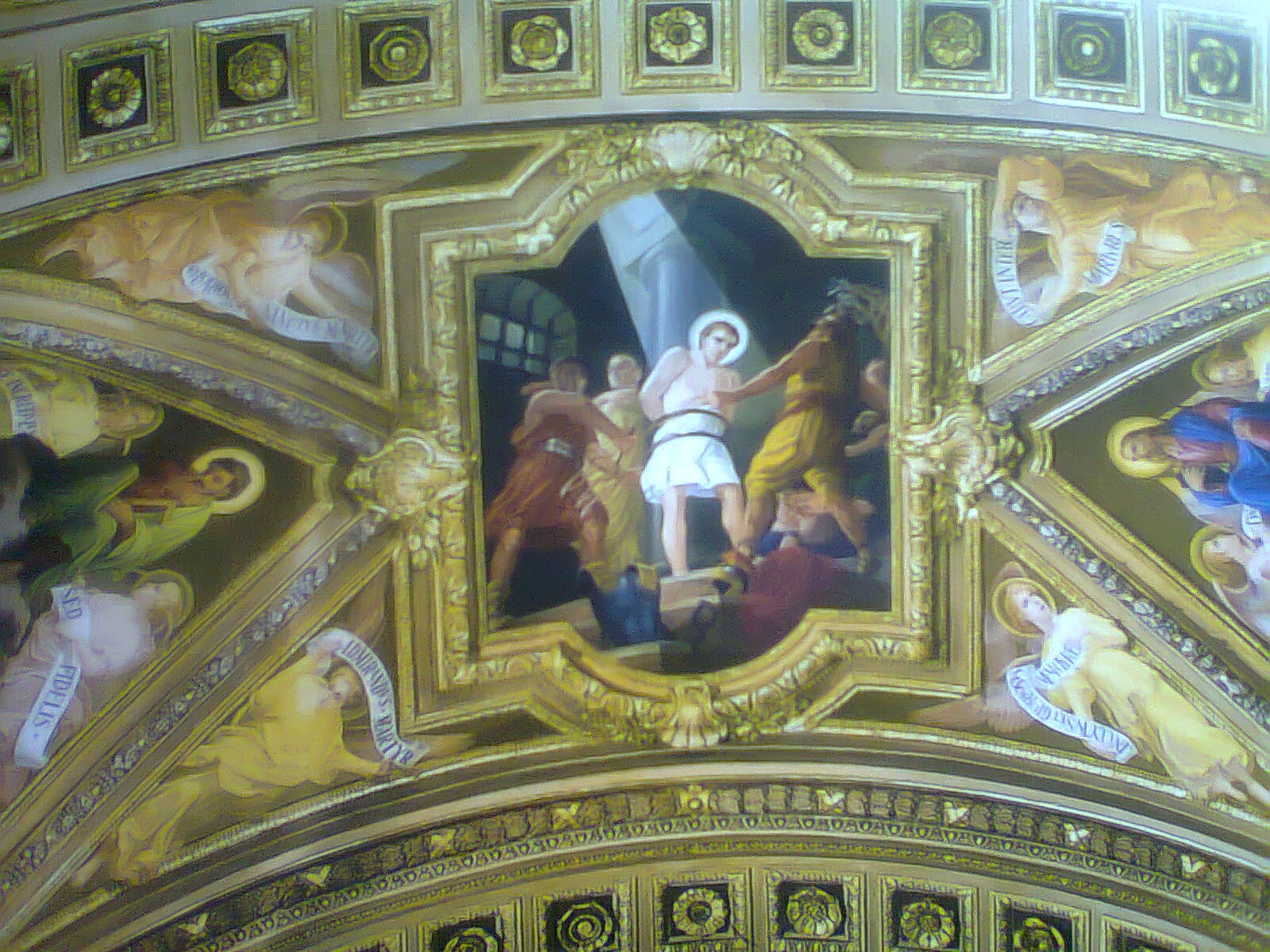
The Martyrdom of Saint George by Giovanni Battista Conti.

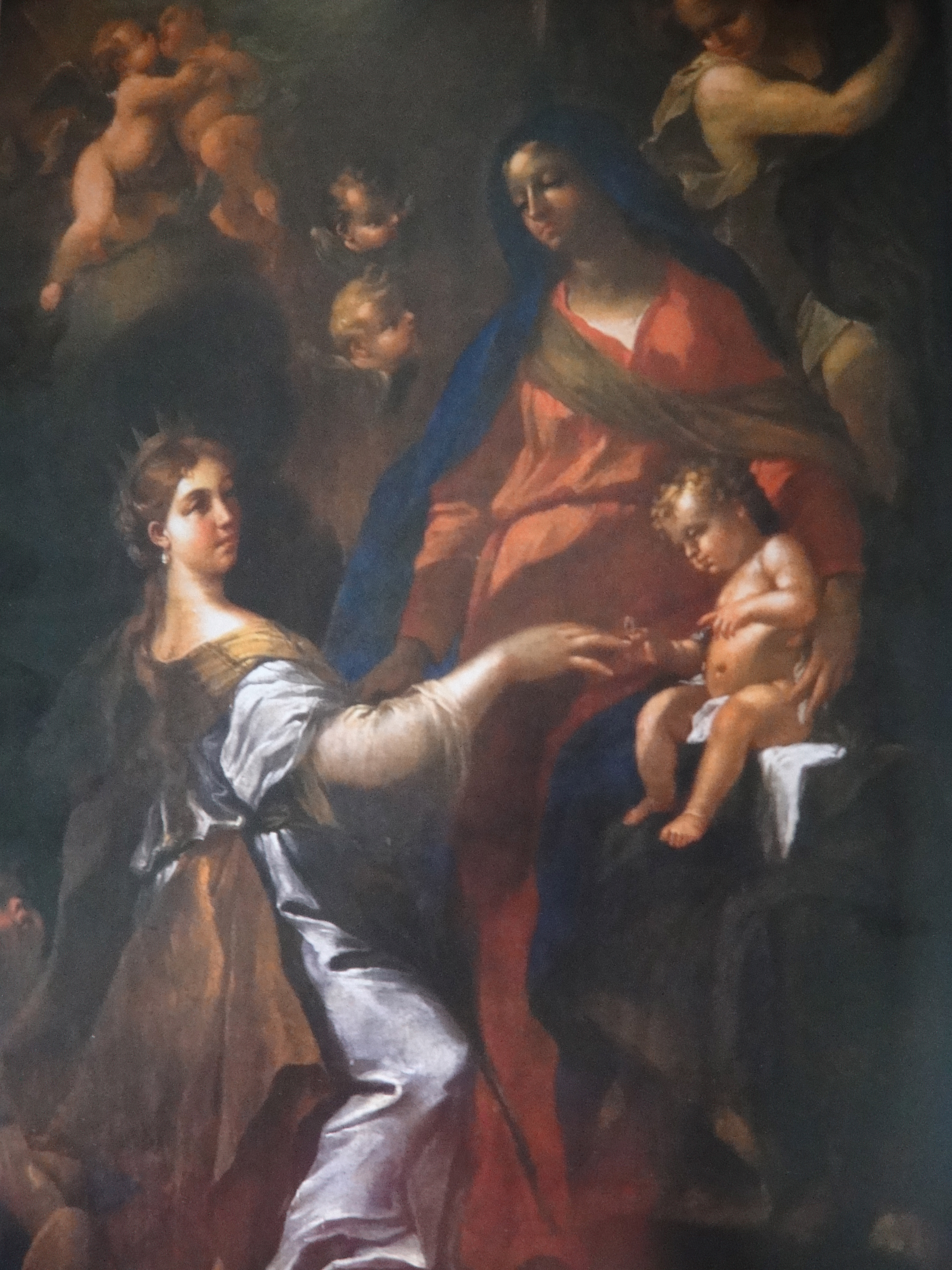
The mystic marriage of St Catherine of Alexandria by Giuseppe D'Arena (18th cent.) located in the first chapel on the right.

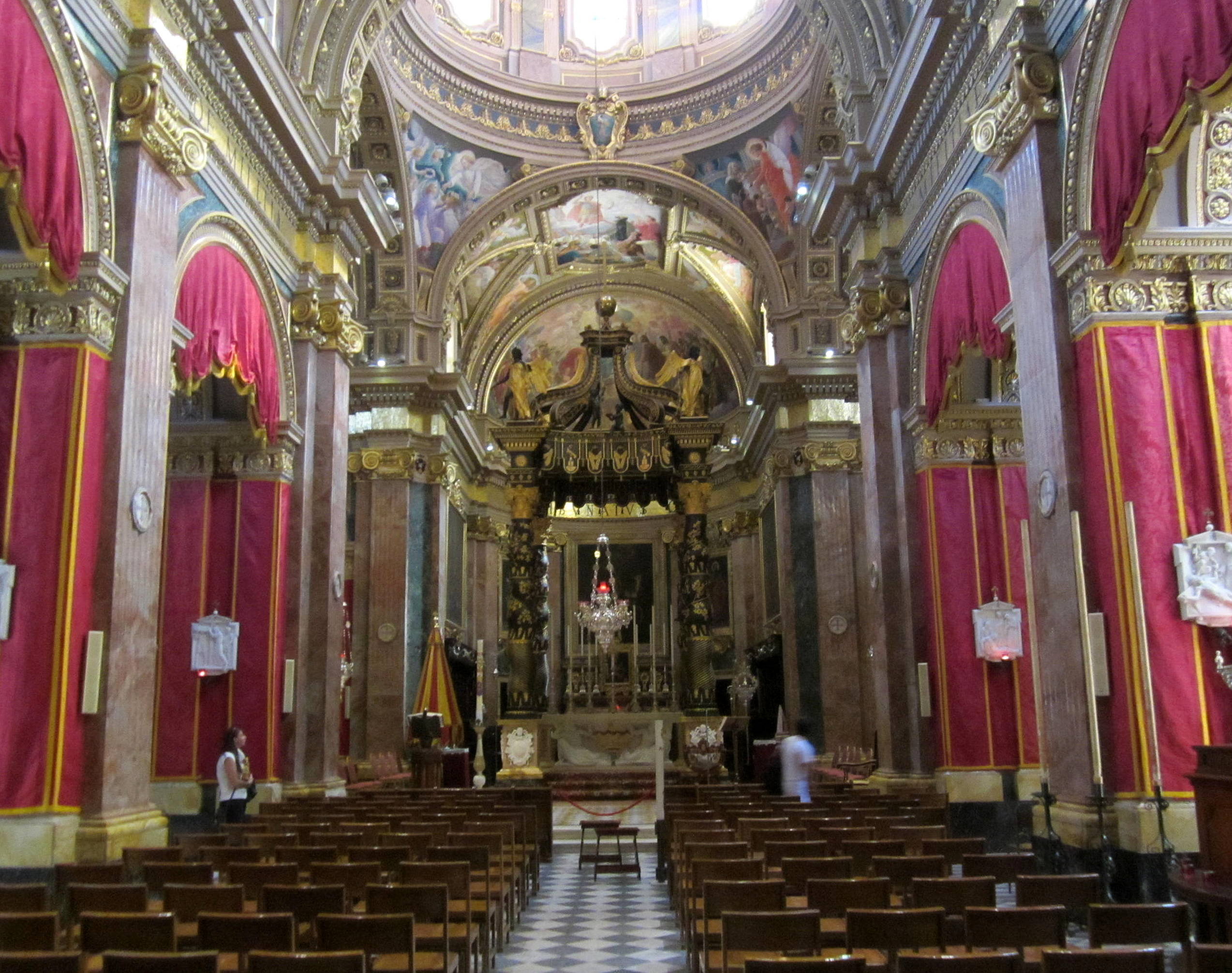
Interior of the basilica.

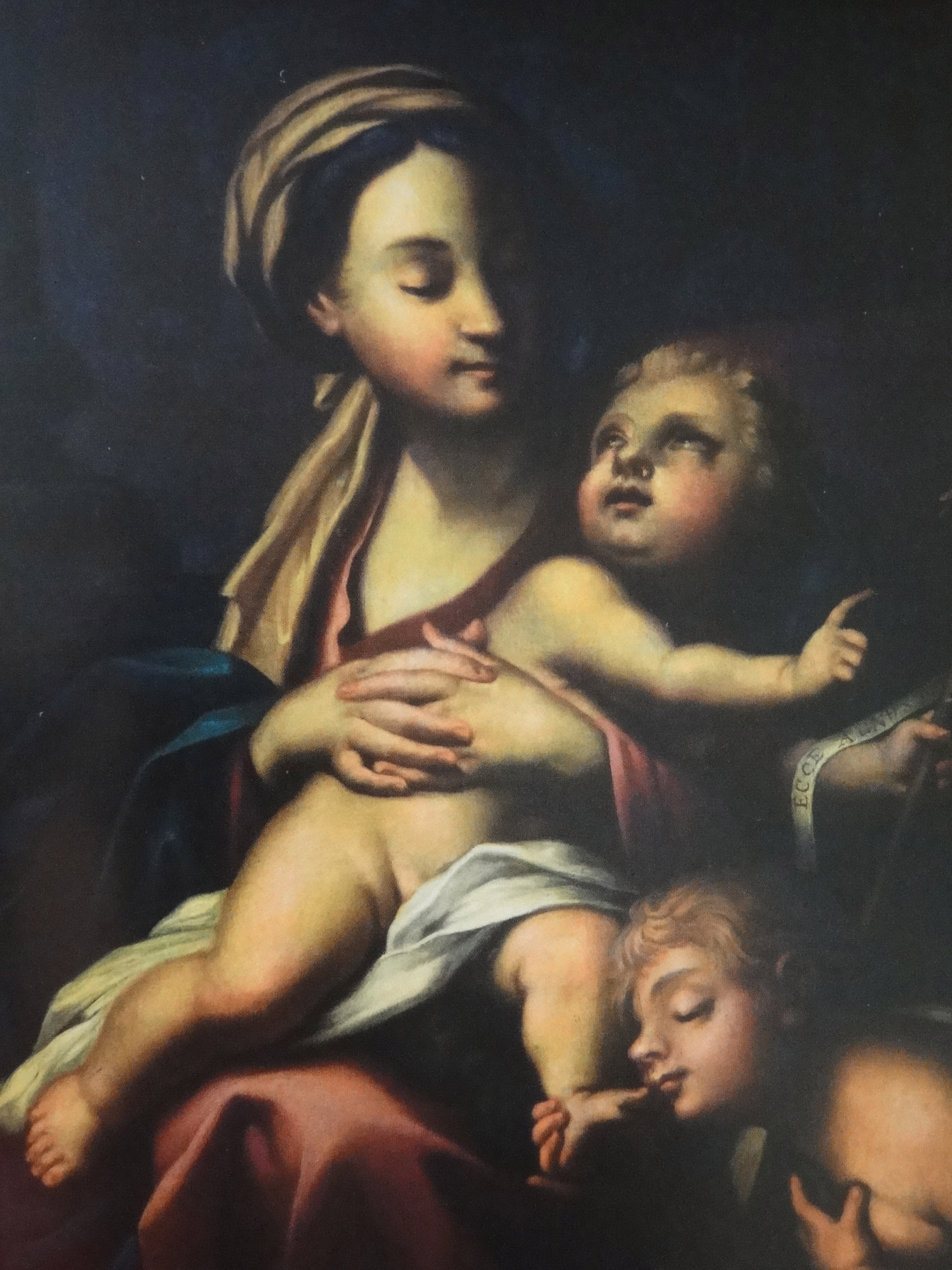
The Virgin and Child with infant John the Baptist by Pierre Guillemin (1732) located at St George's Basilica.

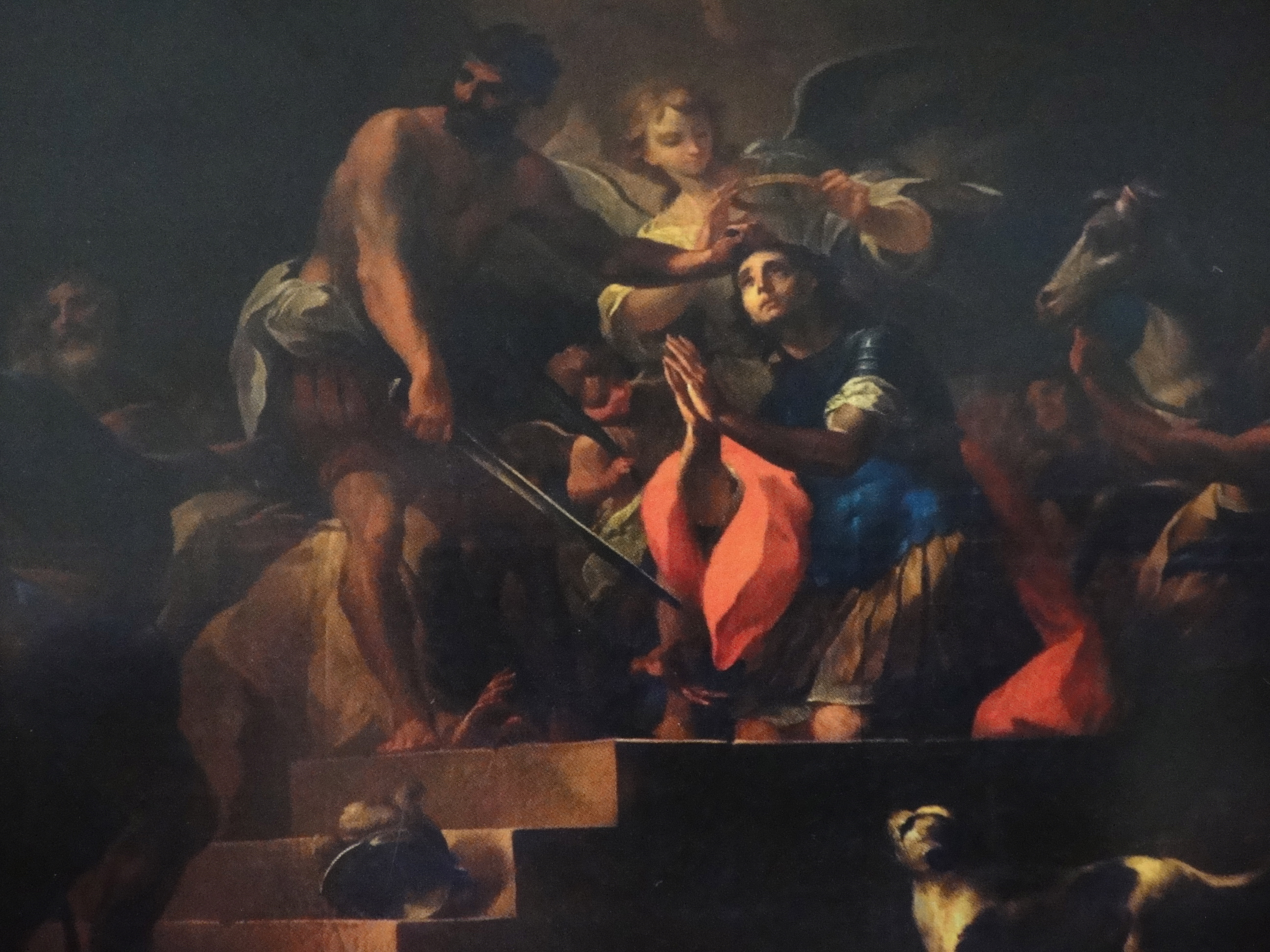
The beheading of St George by Francesco Zahra (1763) located in the choir of the basilica.

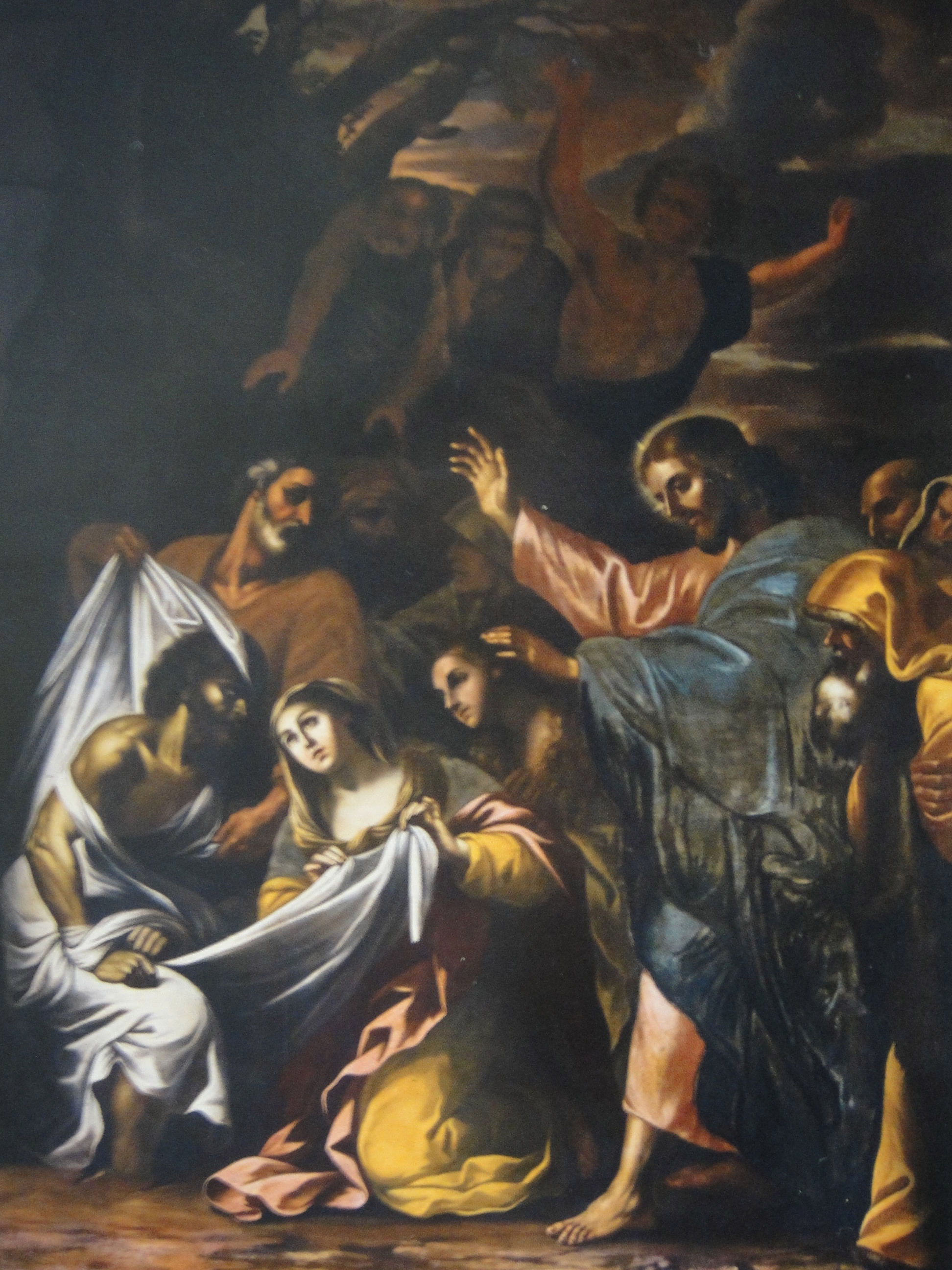
The Rising of Lazarus (1677) by Giuseppe D'Arena.

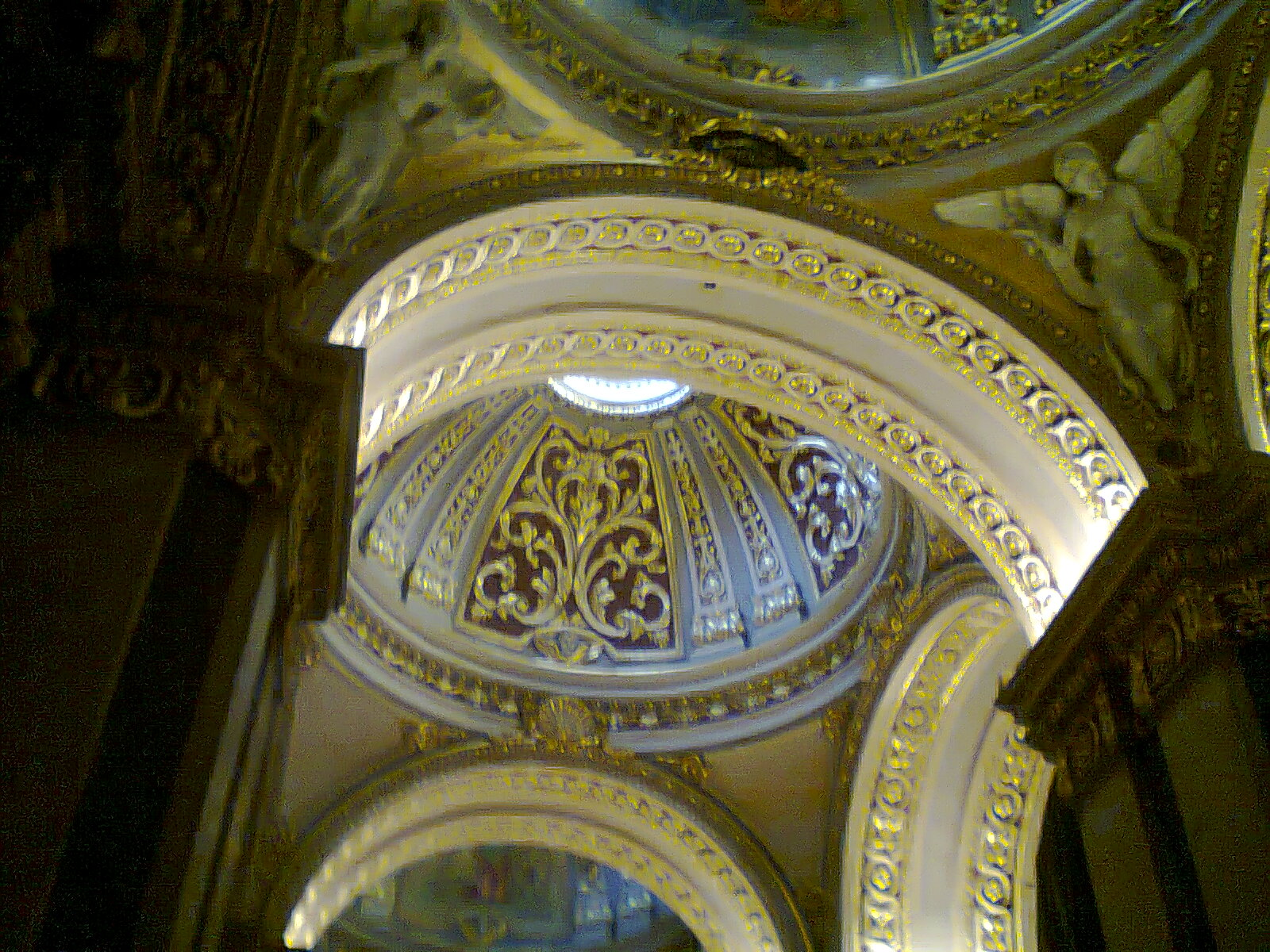
Cupola of the side chapel of the Holy Family.

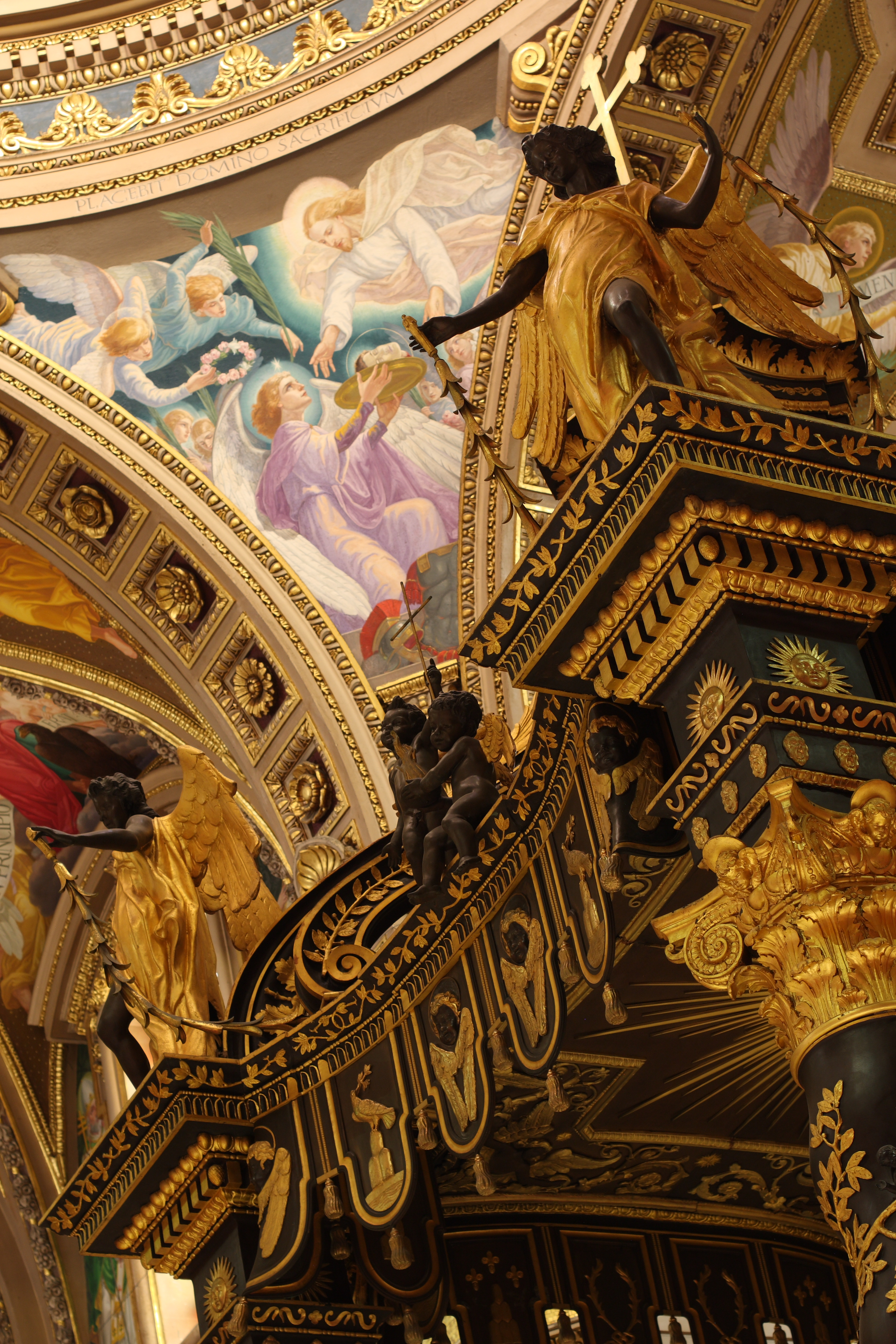
Detail of the canopy.

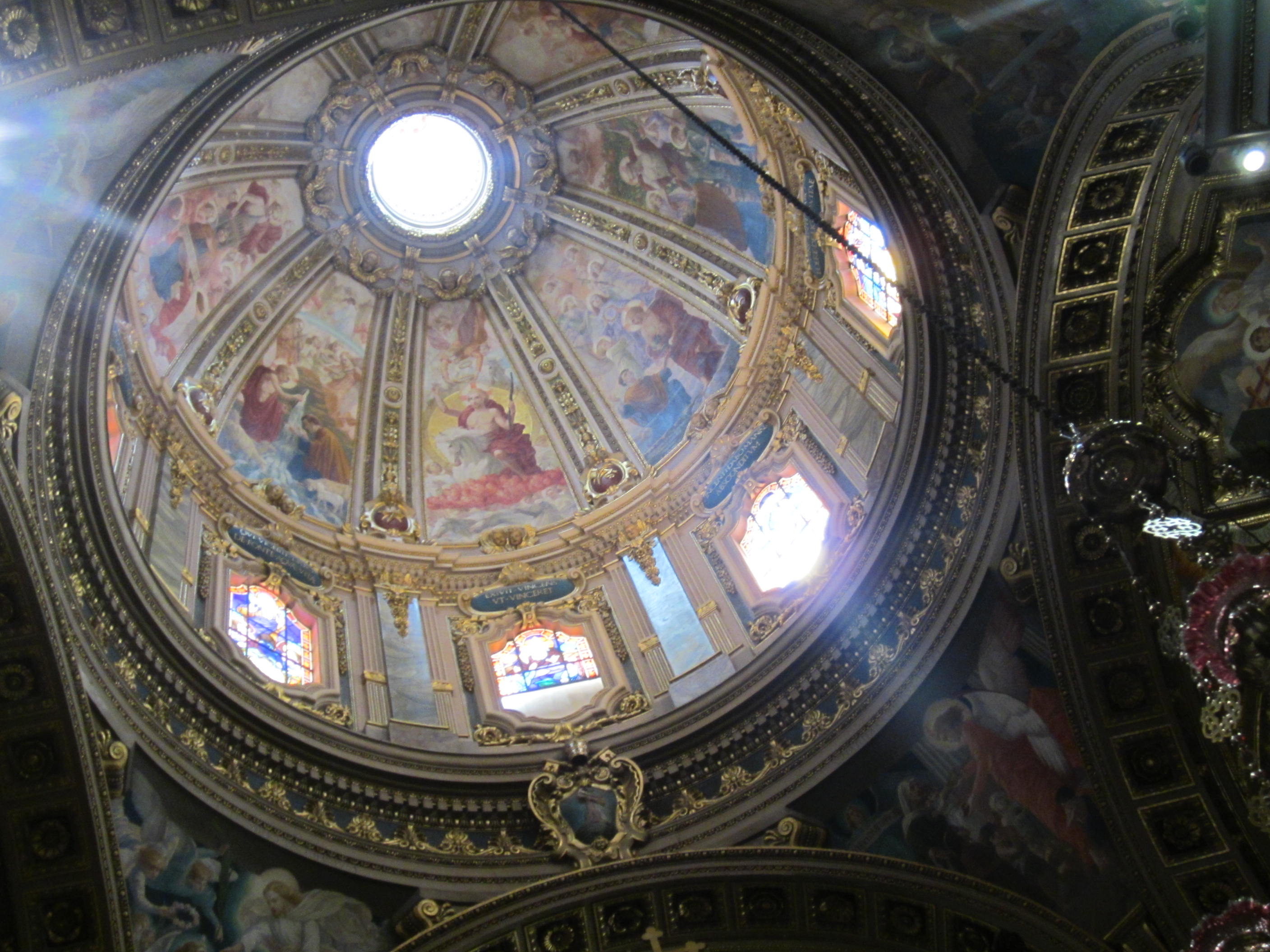
The interior of the main dome.

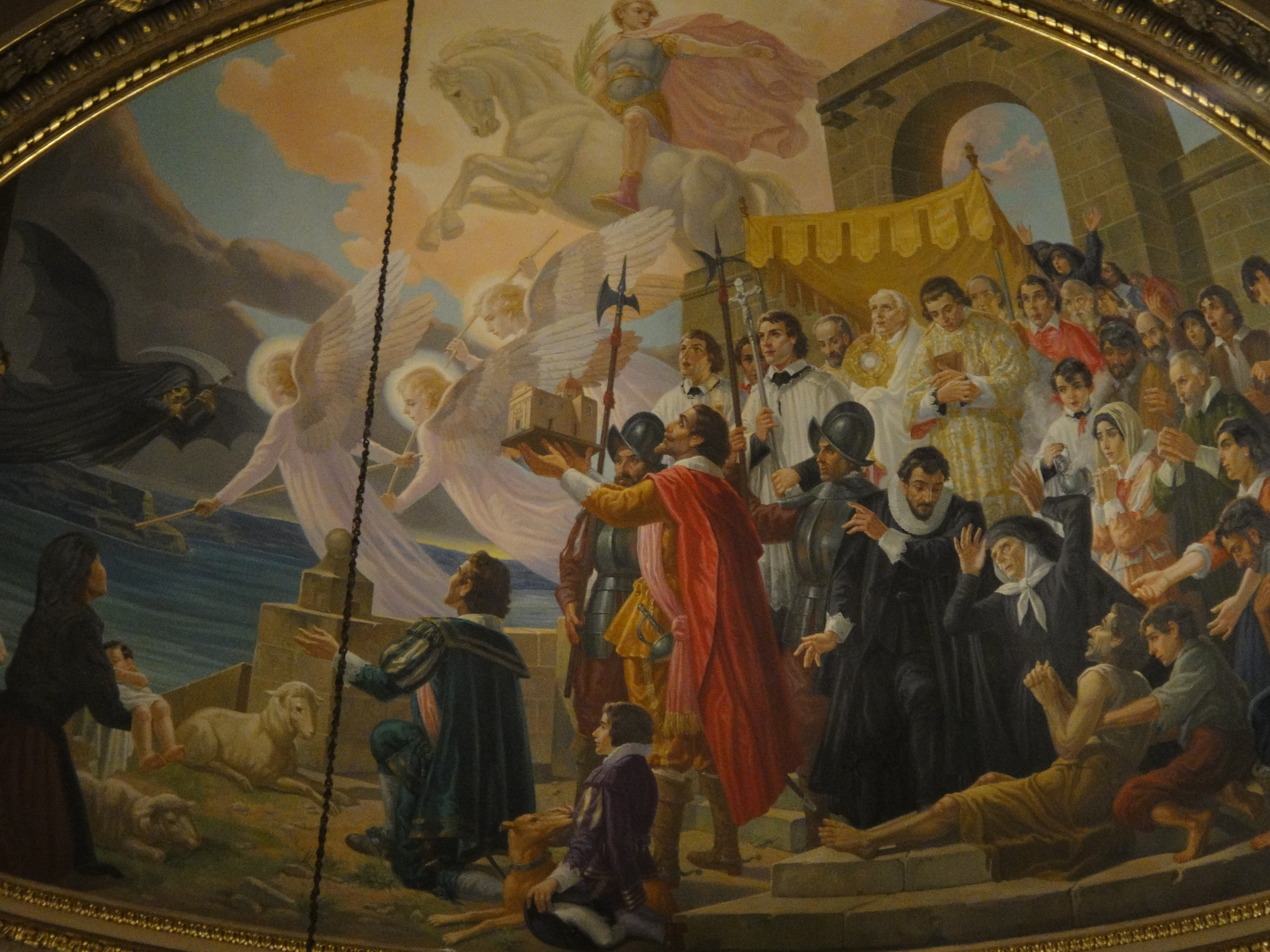
Apse painting showing the deliverance of Gozo from the plague by the intercession of St George.

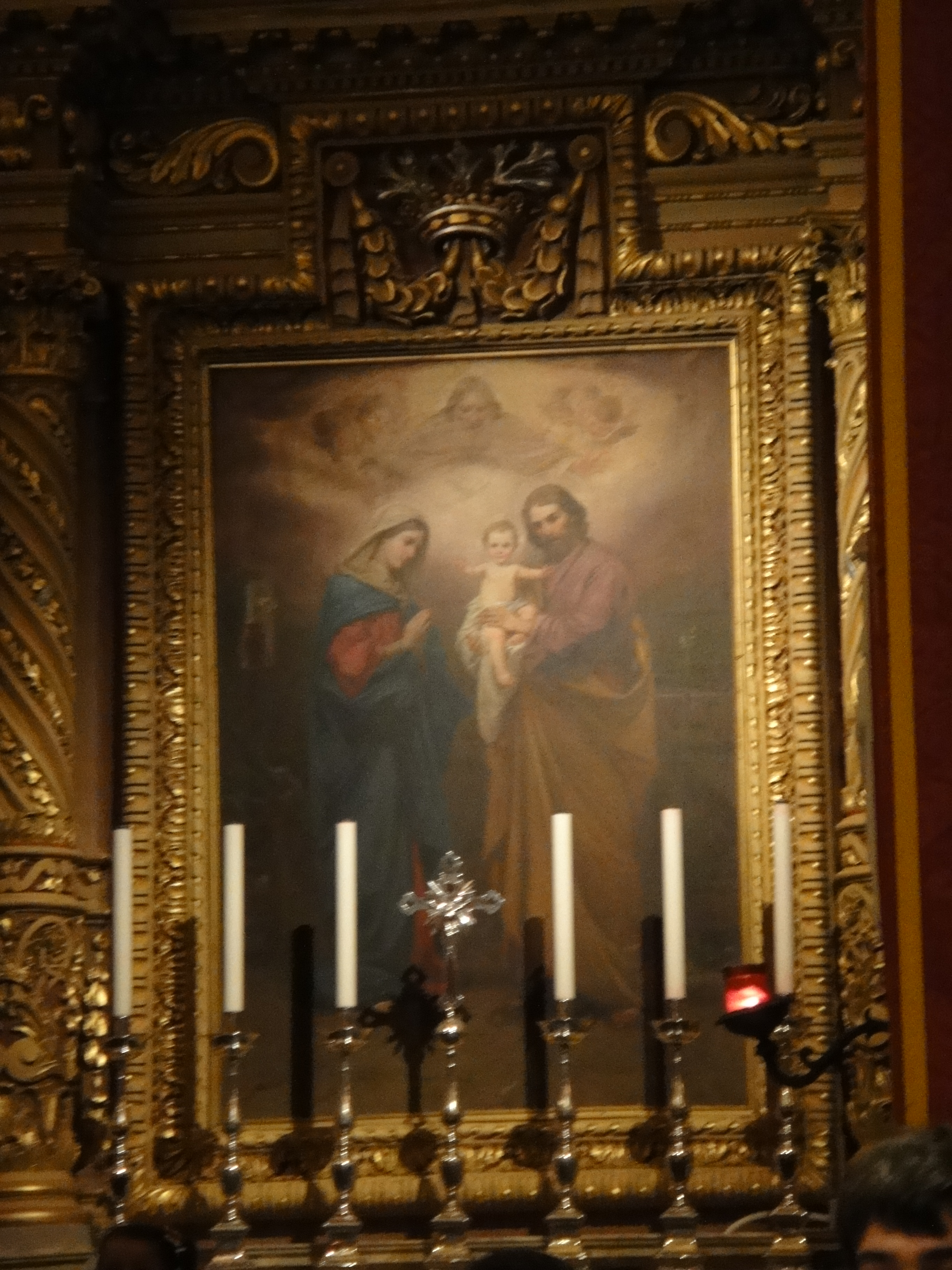
The Holy Family by Giuseppe Calì.

== See also ==
- Culture of Malta
- History of Malta – Maltese history
- List of Churches in Malta
- Religion in Malta
