= 2AP =

2AP or variation, may refer to:

- 2-Acetyl-1-pyrroline, an aroma compound and flavor
- 2^{ap}, codename for the Greek Biblical Codex Basilensis A. N. IV. 4
- Televise Samoa & Radio 2AP, a Samoan TV and radio station, now part of the Samoa Broadcasting Corporation

== See also ==
- AP (disambiguation)
- AAP (disambiguation)
- APAP (disambiguation)
- AP2 (disambiguation)
