= AP2 =

AP2 or variant, may refer to:

== Biochemistry ==
- Activating protein 2 (AP-2), a mammalian transcription factor
- Adipocyte protein 2 (aP2), a carrier protein for fatty acids
- AP2 adaptors (AP-2 complex), which aid clathrin mediated endocytosis
- Apetala 2 (AP2), a plant transcription factor

== Vehicles and transportation ==
- Automotive products AP2, Automatic transmission used in the minimatic, mini, metro, allegro and 1100/1300 road vehicles.
- Autopista AP-2, a roadway in Spain
- Seversky AP-2, a U.S. interwar patrol fighter plane
- USS Doyen (AP-2), a U.S. Navy WWII transport ship
- Honda S2000 AP2, a variant of the Honda S2000 automobile

== Other uses ==
- Amiga Power, the follow-up website to Amiga gaming magazine
- Argyle Park, industrial/experimental band

== See also ==
- Automotive Products, a manufacturer of automatic transmissions in UK
- AP (disambiguation)
- APP (disambiguation)
- APAP (disambiguation)
- 2AP (disambiguation)
