= PAA =

PAA may refer to:

== Businesses and organizations ==
- Pacific American Airlines
- Pamoja African Alliance, a Kenyan political party
- PanAfrican Archaeological Association
- Pan African Association
- Pan American World Airways, commonly known as Pan Am
- Pan American Association of Anatomy
- Patriot Alliance Association, a radical Chinese nationalist party in Taiwan
- Pickleball Australia Association, Australia's national governing body for pickleball
- Pickleball Association of Australia, former name of Pickleball Association of Queensland
- Polish American Association
- Population Association of America, dedicated to population and demography studies
- Portland Adventist Academy, an Adventist High School

== Science, technology and mathematics ==
=== Chemistry and materials science ===
- Peroxyacetic acid, a chemical
- Pharmacologic Ascorbic Acid, a medical treatment
- Phenylacetic acid, a chemical
- Phosphoamino acid analysis, a biochemistry technique
- Polyacrylamide, an acrylate polymer
- Polyacrylic acid, an acrylic polymer
- Primary Aromatic Amine, a group of compounds

=== Electronic devices ===
- Personal Attack Alarm
- Piezo Audio Amplifier

=== Linguistics ===
- Proto-Afroasiatic language
- Proto-Austroasiatic language

=== Statistics ===
- Piecewise Aggregate Approximation, dimension reduction method

== Legislation ==
- Perpetuities and Accumulations Act 1964, UK act of Parliament
- Perpetuities and Accumulations Act 2009, UK act of Parliament
- Protect America Act of 2007, amendment to the US Foreign Intelligence Surveillance Act

== Other uses ==
- Penny Arcade Adventures, video game series
- Prueba de Aptitud Académica, standardized test for university admissions

== See also ==
- Paa (disambiguation)
