= AAAP =

"aaap" or "AAAP" may refer to:

- Amateur Astronomers Association of Pittsburgh
- Amino Acid/Auxin Permease (AAAP) Family, family of secondary transport proteins
- American Academy of Addiction Psychiatry
- American Association of Applied Psychologists
- Asociación de Atletismo del Alto Paraná
- American Association for Applied Psychology
- NASDAQ-Code for Advanced Accelerator Applications
- Atheists & Agnostics Alliance Pakistan
