= Pharmaceutical Research (journal) =

- Discipline: Pharmaceutical sciences
- Language: English
- Edited by: Tonglei Li

Publication details
- History: 1980–present
- Publisher: Springer Science+Business Media
- Frequency: Monthly
- Impact factor: 4.20 (2020)

Standard abbreviations
- ISO 4: Pharm. Res.

Indexing
- ISSN: 0724-8741 (print); 1573-904X (web)

Links
- Journal homepage

Pharmaceutical Research is an official journal of the American Association of Pharmaceutical Scientists and covers research spanning the entire spectrum of drug discovery, development, evaluation, and regulatory approval. Small drug molecules, biotechnology products including genes, peptides, proteins and vaccines, and genetically engineered cells are an integral part of papers published. Current emphasis of the journal includes the following areas: preformulation; drug delivery and targeting; formulation design, engineering, and processing; pharmacokinetics, pharmacodynamics, and pharmacogenomics; molecular biopharmaceutics and drug disposition; and computational biopharmaceutics, among others.

== Abstracting and indexing ==
The journal is indexed in: Chemical Abstracts Service, Current Contents/Life Sciences, EMBASE, International Pharmaceutical Abstracts, PubMed/Medline, Science Citation Index, and Scopus.
