= AAPP =

AAPP may refer to:

- American Association of Psychiatric Pharmacists, a US association of pharmacists
- Assistance Association for Political Prisoners, an independent non-profit organisation
- Associação Atlética Ponte Preta, a Brazilian association football club
- Association for the Advancement of Philosophy and Psychiatry, US
- Association of Asian Parliaments for Peace
- Airborne Auxiliary Power Plant, the Royal Air Force designation for Auxiliary Power Unit in Cold War-era aircraft such as the Avro Vulcan
