= Julie Apap =

Maltese ceramicist (1948–2011)

- Born: 1948
- Died: March 16, 2011 (aged 62)
- Known for: Ceramics

Julie Apap (1948 – 16 March 2011) was a Maltese ceramicist based in Msida. Active from the 1990s until her death in 2010, she exhibited in Malta, the U.S., Egypt, and Croatia.

== Career ==
She studied ceramics in England and Malta and later taught the subject at a secondary school and at her own studio, The Pot Studio in Msida, Malta. The studio was a hub for a number of female Malta-based ceramicists during the 2000s. She taught privately at the studio for 20 years.

Apap worked in both clay and porcelain. She created a range of ceramic work, including "functional ware," jewelry, and more sculptural pieces.

Apap was known for her signature blue glaze, and kept its exact production secret. Her work was also characterized by its precision and its "inoffensive and playful" qualities. Her work was inspired by the Maltese landscape and by neolithic temples and other aspects of Maltese prehistory.

Towards the end of her life, Apap left teaching due to heart problems; however, she continued to keep the studio open.

== Personal life and death ==
Apap was married to Carmel Apap and had two children.

In March 2011, Apap fell ill while on a bus ride with her father. She was taken to the hospital, where she died on March 16.

== Exhibitions ==
Between 1990 and her death in 2010, Julie Apap participated in a variety of solo and group exhibitions both within Malta and internationally. In Malta, she exhibited her work at Mdina Cathedral Museum. the National Museum of Archaeology, and the Banca Giuratale in Victoria. Internationally, she showed her work in California, U.S. and Zagreb, Croatia. In 2000, she showed her work at the 5th Cairo Biennale for International Ceramics (Egypt). In 2007 and 2009, her work was included in group exhibitions held jointly with Cypriot ceramicists.

Some of Apap's work was posthumously exhibited at the inaugural Malta Ceramics Festival in 2011 in Attard, alongside the work of ceramicists Joseph Casha and Neville Ferry, who also died in 2010.

=== Selected group exhibitions ===
- Group Exhibition with Jeni Caruana and Hedwig Hauck, Mdina Cathedral Museum, Mdina, Malta (1993)
- Seven Women-Seven Temples, National Museum of Archaeology, Malta, Valleta, Malta (1999)
- Collective Exhibition, California Institute of Integral Studies, California, U.S. (2000)
- Hypogeum, National Museum of Archeology (2000)
- Creation, Gallery G, Lija (2006)
- Lilliput Ceramics — collective exhibition, Zagreb, Croatia (2006)
- Ministry for Tourism and Culture, Valletta (2007)
- Casino Maltese, Valletta; organized by Flimkien għal Ambjent Aħjar (FAA) (2009)
- Saint James Cavalier, Valletta (2009)
- Tribute, Parish Centre, Papa Ġwanni Pawlu II, Attard (2011)

=== Solo exhibitions ===
- Working with the Earth, Grand Hotel Mercure San Antonio, Bugibba (2003)
- Banca Giuratale, Victoria, Gozo Region, Malta (2007)
