= American Association of Applied Psychologists =

- Abbreviation: AAAP
- Successor: New incarnation of the American Psychological Association
- Founded: 1937
- Dissolved: 1945
- Merger of: Association of Consulting Psychologists (founded in 1930) and American Psychological Association's section on clinical psychology (founded in 1913)
- Type: Professional organization
- Purpose: Advancing applied psychology
- Headquarters: United States

The American Association of Applied Psychologists (abbreviated AAAP) was a short-lived American professional organization dedicated to applied psychology.

== History ==
AAAP was founded in 1937 when the Association of Consulting Psychologists, which had been founded in 1930, merged with the American Psychological Association's section on clinical psychology, which had been founded in 1913.

In the fall of 1939, around the time when World War II began, the AAAP and the American Psychological Association (APA) formed a joint emergency council to prepare for the impending war. This council later became a division of the National Research Council known as the Emergency Committee in Psychology.

The AAAP merged with several other psychology organizations in 1944 and 1945 to form a new incarnation of the American Psychological Association.
