= Lorenzo de Apapis =

Maltese Catholic priest (c. 1501 – 1586)

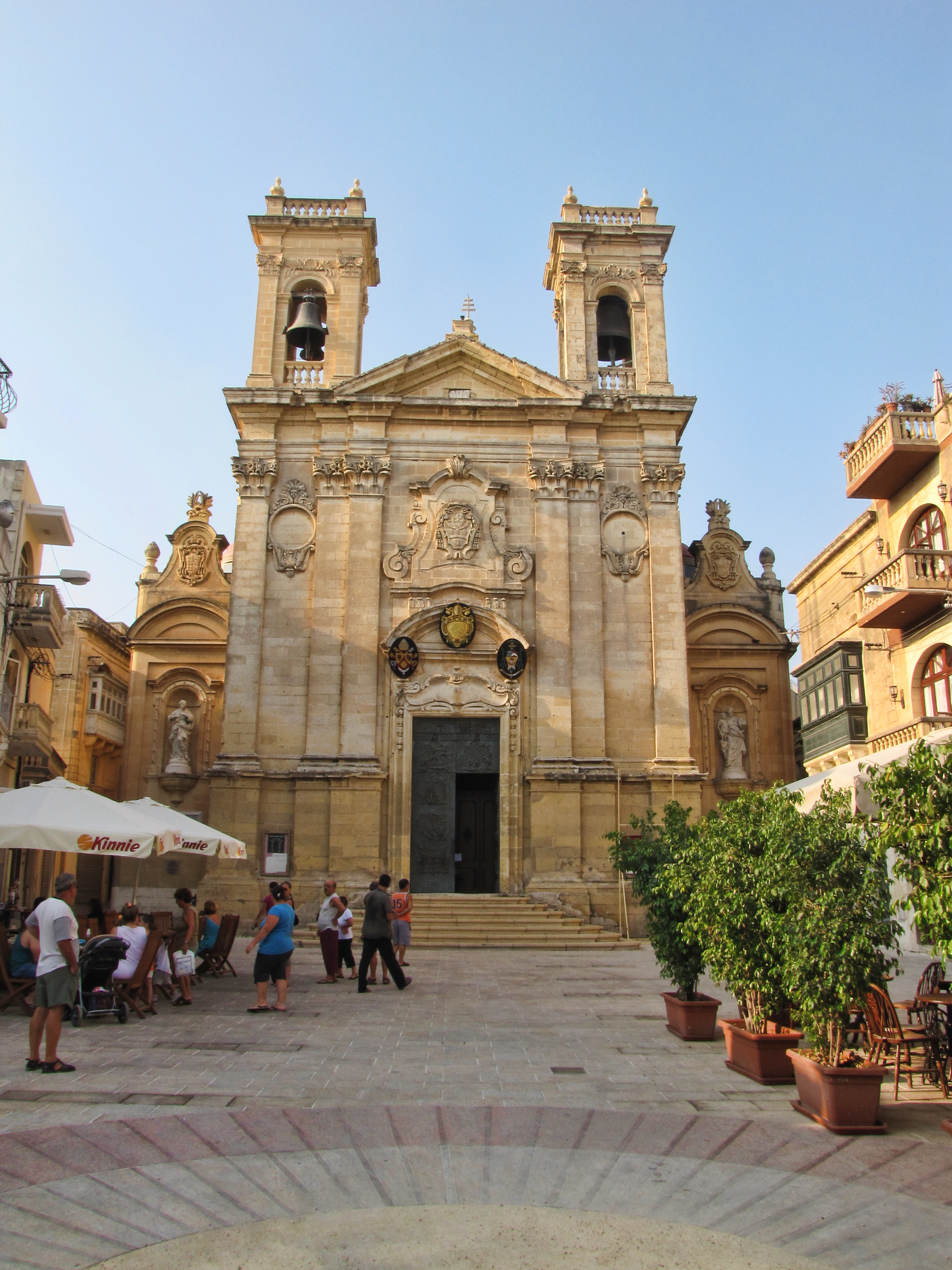
The Parish Church of St George in Rabat, Gozo, where de Apapis was parish priest. The building which stood during his time no longer exists; the present church was constructed in its stead during the 17th century and was altered in the 19th and 20th centuries.

Don Lorenzo de Apapis (Note: Sources use several slightly different variants of his name, including Lorenzo Apap, Lorenzo Apapis, Lorenzo de Apapis, Laurencius de Apapis, Laurentius de Apapis, and Lawrenz de Apapis.) (c. 1501 – 1586) was a Gozitan parish priest, vicar foraneus, and notary. He was captured and enslaved during the Ottoman Empire's attack on Gozo in 1551, and was ransomed and returned to Malta by 1553.

== Biography ==
De Apapis was born in around 1501 to Leonardo Apap and his wife Garita née Debuis. He is believed to have trained to become a priest through an apprenticeship-like system, and he likely also studied law. From 1540 he practiced the profession of a notary public, and at one point he was the only Gozitan-born notary on the island.

In July 1551, Ottoman forces invaded Gozo and the island's Castello surrendered after two days of bombardment. The majority of Gozo's population was enslaved and the captives – including de Apapis – were taken to North Africa and later to the Ottoman capital Constantinople. Since he was from a wealthy family which formed part of the gentry and which had connections with the Maltese nobility, de Apapis was ransomed from slavery relatively quickly, as were several other Gozitan notables. He returned to the Maltese Islands by 28 October 1553, and on that day he published the will of Guillelmus de Manuele alias Mollica in Malta's capital Birgu. He later made his way back to Gozo, and he became one of the leaders of the surviving community on the depopulated island.

De Apapis appears to have traveled back to the Ottoman Empire to offer his services as a notary to other enslaved Gozitans, as evidenced by a will he published in Constantinople for the Magnifica Domina Damma Rapa on 15 May 1555. During the Great Siege of Malta, de Apapis was in Birgu when the city was besieged by the Ottomans, as evidenced by a will of Antonella de Amfasino he published on 12 August 1565.

De Apapis was appointed as parish priest of Gozo's parish of St George by Bishop Domenico Cubelles, and he also held the office of vicar foraneus. By 1575, the St George parish church was in a poor state as it had been damaged in 1551 and in several other corsair raids in subsequent years; de Apapis is known to have contributed from his own pocket for its upkeep. He practiced as a notary until 1583, and he died in 1586 at the age of 85.

Details of de Apapis's life are known from three main primary sources: his notarial register which is preserved at the Notarial Archives in Valletta, a 1575 report by Pietro Dusina, and de Apapis's own last will and testament which was published in 1579. De Apapis's notarial register has been studied by historians as a key source of information about Gozitan society after the 1551 depopulation. A copy made by de Apapis of a 15th-century will is the oldest surviving Gozitan record preserved in the Maltese Islands.

== Legacy ==
An inscribed marble plaque commemorating de Apapis was installed at St George's Basilica in 2001. This features a bronze relief by artist Saviour Farrugia.
