= Paa (given name) =

Paa is a Ghanaian masculine given name. Notable people with the name include:

- Paa Grant (1878–1956), Ghanaian politician
- Paa Joe (born 1947), Ghanaian artist
- Paa Kwesi Nduom (born 1953), Ghanaian politician
- Paa Nii Lutterodt (1937–2006), Ghanaian international football player
