= Academy of Applied Pharmaceutical Sciences =

Coordinates: 43.7727833°N 079.3313833°W

AAPS College of Health, Science and Technology is an English-language private post-secondary career college, with campuses in North York and Mississauga, Ontario. It was founded as the Academy of Applied Pharmaceutical Sciences (AAPS) Inc. in 2003, rebranding to its current name in early 2026.

2013 and 2023 reports found that, in comparison to other colleges in the sector, graduates of the college are less likely to become employed in their field of study.

== History ==
AAPS was founded in 2003 by Dr. Barghian and Laleh Bighash, whose combined vision was to integrate a simulated work environment into an academic setting. The overall purpose of this type of learning scheme was to enhance students' abilities to launch their post-degree professional careers in the pharmaceutical industry.

Student enrolment at AAPS averages 100–120 students per academic year. The student graduation rate is 98%, and the post-graduation employment rate is 85%, both of which are among the highest rates compared other pharmaceutical industry training schools.

According to a Forum Research study prepared for the Government of Ontario, based on data from 2013, AAPS had an 88.3% graduation rate but only 38.1% of graduates found employment and only 23.8% of graduates found work in their field of study – the latter figure being less than half the average rate for private career colleges. Graduates of the diploma program in clinical research fared the worst, with only 12.5% finding employment in their field of study.

According to an Ontario Ministry of Colleges report using 2023 data, AAPS had an 82.3% graduation rate with a 71.4% graduate employment rate, but only 42.9% of graduates found employment in their field of study – more than 10% below the average for their educational sector. Of the graduates who could be contacted, 77.1% reported that they were satisfied with their college experience. Two months after this report was published, AAPS rebranded itself.

=== Notable events ===
- 2003: Dr. Barghian and Laleh Bighash found and establish the Academy of Applied Pharmaceutical Sciences (AAPS) Inc.
- 2004: AAPS becomes the first private career college to offer a diploma program in Professional Regulatory Affairs.
- 2005: AAPS launched the Continuing Education unit, providing workshop, courses, and certificate training for pharmaceutical industry careers.
- 2007: AAPS becomes the first private career college to offer a diploma program in clinical research.
- 2009: AAPS becomes first career college in Canada to offer diploma programs in food safety and quality
- 2010: AAPS launches online courses and online certificate programs
- 2014: AAPS becomes the first private career college in Canada to offer a ministry approved diploma program in professional clinical research and pharmacovigilance

== Programs ==
The courses and programs offered at AAPS range across various disciplines within Life Science and Pharmaceutical training, including:

- Professional Diploma in Clinical Research and Pharmacovigilance
- Canadian Registered Nurse Examination (CRNE) Preparation
- Certificate Programs that include over 150 courses in the areas of Pharmaceutical Sales, Project Management, Validation, Six Sigma, High Performance Liquid Chromatography (HPLC), and Pharmaceutical Laboratory.
- Diploma Programs:
  - Food Safety and Quality
  - Pharmaceutical Quality Assurance and Quality Control
  - Pharmaceutical Quality Control
  - Regulatory Affairs
  - Clinical Research and Pharmacovigilance
- Workshops and Free Live Webinar Programs on various pharmacy and business-related topics

== Facilities ==
AAPS has three on-site facilities in order to expose students to laboratory environments and protocol. Students work independently and are given the opportunity to work directly with materials and equipment, as well as to run various experiments and tests. Each of the three facilities is dedicated to a particular domain:

- Pharmaceutical Laboratory: fully equipped for students to perform tests on pharmaceutical raw material, in-process material and finished products.
- Analytical Chemistry Laboratory: includes sample preparation station, wet chemistry testing station, physical chemistry testing station, HPLC, UV, IR, Autotitrators, pH meters.
- Microbiology Laboratory: dedicated to microbiological, pathogenic and food allergen testing.

== See also ==
- Higher education in Ontario
