= Phosphoamino acid analysis =

Phosphoamino acid analysis, or PAA, is an experimental technique used in molecular biology to determine which amino acid or acids are phosphorylated in a protein.

== Technique ==
A protein is first phosphorylated using ^{32}P-labeled ATP, usually via an in vitro kinase assay. Most of the amino acids in the protein are then hydrolyzed, usually by the use of a strong acid such as hydrochloric acid. These amino acids are then separated using 2-dimensional thin layer chromatography, along with amino acid standards for the three amino acids that are phosphorylated in eukaryotes: serine, threonine, and tyrosine. These amino acid standards can be visualized on the TLC substrate by exposure to ninhydrin, which colors the amino acids a visible purple when heated at ~100 °C. The radioactive amino acids can be detected via autoradiography, and an overlay of the two images will show which amino acids are phosphorylated.
