= Paper money of the Hungarian pengő =

Hungarian pengő paper money (Hungarian: pengő papírpénz) was part of the physical form of Hungary's historical currency, the Hungarian pengő. Paper money usually meant banknotes, which were issued (either in fact or in name) by the Hungarian National Bank. Later – during and after World War II – other types of paper money appeared, including emergency money, bonds and savings certificates.

Initially, paper money was designed abroad, and printed using simple methods. Later, more advanced techniques were used, creating banknotes which reflected stability. After the war, in parallel with their loss in value, the quality of banknotes decreased. Finally, not even serial numbers were printed on the notes.

== Banknotes ==
=== Languages inscribed ===
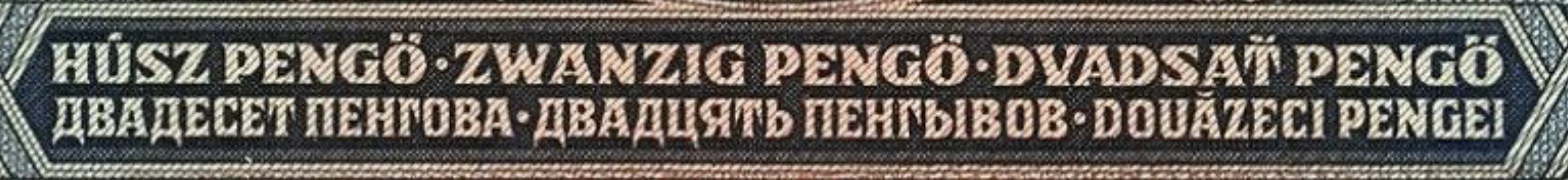

As late as 1945, the reverse side of banknotes included the denomination spelled out six times in words, in five non-Hungarian languages representing territories that Hungary had lost after World War One: Romanian (which was spoken in Transylvania and eastern Banat), Slovak (Slovakia), Serbo-Croatian (Vojvodina) in the Latin and Cyrillic scripts, Rusyn (Transcarpathia) and German (Burgenland).

=== First series (1926) ===
The first series of pengő banknotes were printed in 1926 in the following denominations: 5 P, 10 P, 20 P, 50 P, and 100 P. All these banknotes were designed by Ferenc Helbing. Due to the poor printing technology (offset printing) counterfeits appeared in a short time. The situation was so serious that the banknotes soon had to be replaced with a new series. As a consequence, these are among the most valued collector rarities among Hungarian banknotes.

1926 series
Image		Value	Dimensions	Description		Date of		
Obverse	Reverse	Value	Dimensions	Obverse	Reverse	printing	issue	withdrawal
		5 pengő	150 × 75 mm	Portrait of Count István Széchenyi by Friedrich Amerling	View of the Széchenyi Chain Bridge	1 March 1926	27 December 1926	30 June 1929
		10 pengő	157 × 78 mm	Ferenc Deák	The Hungarian Parliament Building	1 March 1926	27 December 1926	30 June 1930
		20 pengő	166 × 84 mm	Lajos Kossuth	Géza Mészöly's painting: "Balaton scene"	1 March 1926	27 December 1926	31 May 1931
		50 pengő	175 × 90 mm	Portrait of Ferenc II Rákóczi by Ádám Mányoki	Károly Lotz's painting: "Stallions in the shower"	1 March 1926	27 December 1926	31 March 1935
		100 pengő	182 × 96 mm	Portrait of King Matthias Corvinus by Giovanni Antonio Boltraffio	View of the Buda Castle with the Danube	1 March 1926	27 December 1926	30 April 1933
These images are to scale at 0.7 pixel per millimetre (18 pixel per inch). For table standards, see the banknote specification table.

=== Second series (1927–1932) ===
The first denomination of the second series of pengő banknotes was the 1000 pengő note, designed by Zoltán Egri. In contrast to the 1926 series, this banknote (as well as the other notes of this series) was printed using intaglio printing. The next banknote of the series was the 5 pengő note (dated 1928), then the 10 pengő (1929), 20 and 100 pengő (1930), and the 50 pengő notes (1932). These banknotes were designed by Álmos Jaschik.

1927–1932 series
Image		Value	Dimensions	Description		Date of		
Obverse	Reverse	Value	Dimensions	Obverse	Reverse	printing	issue	withdrawal
		5 pengő	150 × 75 mm	Portrait of Count István Széchenyi by Friedrich Amerling	View of the Széchenyi Chain Bridge	1 August 1928	20 December 1928	31 December 1930
		10 pengő	159 × 80 mm	Ferenc Deák	The Hungarian Parliament Building	1 February 1929	11 December 1929	30 November 1939
		20 pengő	165 × 85 mm	Lajos Kossuth	The Hungarian National Bank building	2 January 1930	20 November 1930	31 October 1943
		50 pengő	168 × 86 mm	Sándor Petőfi	János Visky's painting: "Herding in Hortobágy"	1 October 1932	10 September 1934	6 May 1946
		100 pengő	176 × 91 mm	Portrait of King Matthias Corvinus by Andrea Mantegna	View of the Buda Castle with the Danube	1 July 1930	25 October 1932	6 May 1946
		1000 pengő	192 × 112 mm	The Hungária-head from the Statue of Liberty in Arad	Gyula Benczúr's painting: "Baptism of Vajk"	1 July 1927	27 December 1927	14 June 1945
These images are to scale at 0.7 pixel per millimetre (18 pixel per inch). For table standards, see the banknote specification table.

=== Low denomination series (1938) ===
In 1938, a series of 50 fillér, 1, 2, and 5 pengő notes were designed by Franke Rupert. The aim of the National Bank was to quickly supply the territories over which Hungary gained control under the First and Second Vienna Awards with low denomination money. However, only the 1 and 5 pengő notes were put into circulation, although printer's proofs of the others also exist. Since the 1 pengő notes serial number was badly designed it couldn't handle many notes so a second issue was printed that was marked with a star in the serial number.

1938 series
Image		Value	Dimensions	Description		Date of		
Obverse	Reverse	Value	Dimensions	Obverse	Reverse	printing	issue	withdrawal
		50 fillér	81 × 48 mm	Female model	Value in different languages	15 January 1938	never	–
		1 pengő	99 × 56 mm	Female model	Value in different languages	15 January 1938	20 January 1941	10 March 1942
		1 pengő (2nd issue)	99 × 56 mm	Female model	Value in different languages	15 January 1938	20 January 1941	10 March 1942
		2 pengő	110 × 61 mm	Female model	Value in different languages	15 January 1938	never	–
		5 pengő	120 × 65 mm	Rózsi Tóth Professional female model	Value in different languages	15 January 1938	5 November 1938	31 July 1939
These images are to scale at 0.7 pixel per millimetre (18 pixel per inch). For table standards, see the banknote specification table.

=== War series (1936–1941) ===
The first banknote of the series is the 10 pengő note, which is dated 1936 but was not put into circulation earlier than 1939 but the 10 pengő was printed from 1936. This banknote was followed by the 5 pengő note (dated 1939), then the 2 pengő (1940) and the 20 pengő notes (1941). A 100 pengő note was also planned, however, it was printed in a slightly different version and only used by the evacuated troops in Austria. The banknotes of the series were designed by Endre Horváth.

1936–1941 series
Image		Value	Dimensions	Description		Date of		
Obverse	Reverse	Value	Dimensions	Obverse	Reverse	printing	issue	withdrawal
		2 pengő	114 × 58 mm	Valéria Rudas Female model from Bény	Mrs. Lajos Fábián with her daughter Marika Fábián from Hollókő	15 July 1940	20 January 1941	10 March 1942
		5 pengő	121 × 59 mm	Mrs. Ferenc Bugárdi (Ms. Julianna Csonka) Female model from Bény	Statue of Sebestyén Tinódi Lantos by Gyula Bezerédi	25 October 1939	18 March 1940	5 August 1942
		5 pengő	121 × 59 mm	Mrs. Ferenc Bugárdi (Ms. Julianna Csonka) Female model from Bény	Statue of Sebestyén Tinódi Lantos by Gyula Bezerédi	25 October 1939	28 April 1945	6 May 1946
		10 pengő	158 × 71 mm	Mary with Jesus and Mária Bőle female model from Pesthidegkút	Statue of king St. Stephen by Alajos Stróbl	22 December 1936	15 May 1939	6 May 1946
		20 pengő	164 × 75 mm	Female model	Young wife and old man in the fields	15 January 1941	16 November 1942	6 May 1946
		100 pengő	?	Female model	Coat of arms and male nudes	?	never	
These images are to scale at 0.7 pixel per millimetre (18 pixel per inch). For table standards, see the banknote specification table.

=== Veszprém series (1943) ===
Series of banknotes were printed in Veszprém by the evacuated Szálasi government and circulated in the Nazi-ruled part of Hungary in 1944.

First, the 100 P note of 1930 and the 10 P note of 1936 were reprinted in late 1944. These banknotes were marked with a star in the serial number (1 pengő notes of 1938 with a star in the serial number are not Veszprém issues), and are much less common than those without it. Some of the 100 P banknotes were overstamped with a 1,000 P adhesive stamp – these were later replaced by the 1,000 P note of 1943.

Later in 1944 there was a plan to issue a new series of 10, 100 and 1000 P banknotes – all designed by Endre Horváth. Due to lack of time, only the 1,000 P note was officially put into circulation, 100 P notes were printed but only used by the evacuated troops in Austria, the 10 P note is only known as printer's proof. The 100 and 1,000 P notes were designed using elements of earlier banknotes.

In the last days of the Szálasi government, some of the notes (10 P of 1936, 20 P of 1941, 50 P of 1932, 100 P of 1930 and 1,000 P of 1943) were overstamped with a green arrow-cross stamp – however, most of these overstamped banknotes are considered to be fake (i.e. overstamped later to turn these common banknotes into more expensive 'rarities'): stamp inks are tend to be very fresh on these banknotes and it is not clear what the purpose of such overstamping would have been.

1943 series
Image		Value	Dimensions	Description		Date of		
Obverse	Reverse	Value	Dimensions	Obverse	Reverse	printing	issue	withdrawal
		10 pengő	? mm	Female model	Woman with sickle and wheat	24 February 1943	never	–
		100 pengő	156 × 100 mm	Rózsi Tóth Professional female model	Coat of arms and male nudes	24 February 1943	never (see text)	–
		1,000 pengő	183 × 100 mm	The Hungária-head from the Statue of Liberty in Arad	View of Buda with the statue of St. Gellért	24 February 1943	4 November 1944	14 June 1945
These images are to scale at 0.7 pixel per millimetre (18 pixel per inch). For table standards, see the banknote specification table.

=== Postwar inflation series (1945–1946) ===
After the war the new democratic government suffered from serious lack of money, so it ordered the national bank to manufacture banknotes quickly and cheaply. There was little time to design new notes, so the plates of banknotes printed in 1926 were reused (compare the 50, 100, 1,000,000 and 100,000,000 notes with the 50, 100, 20 and 10 pengő notes from the 1926 series, respectively) as well as portraits from other notes (e.g. compare the 500 pengő note with the 500,000 korona note and the 100,000 pengő note with the 2 pengő note from 1940). Beginning with the 1000 pengő note, only denominations of integer powers of ten were used. The uncontrolled issue of banknotes aggravated inflation.

In December 1945, the government tried (and failed) to bring inflation under control by a one-off capital levy. This meant that the 1,000, 10,000 and 100,000 pengő banknotes had to be overstamped with a stamp that could be bought for 3 times the value of the banknote. Unstamped banknotes were worth a quarter of their nominal value after this campaign. Later the 100,000 pengő note was issued again in different colors – this banknote and higher denominations did not fall under the capital levy.

==== Milpengő notation: 1 million pengő ====
Although there were plans to issue 10 billion (10^{10}) pengő notes (similar in design to the 1946-version 10 Ft note), denominations higher than one billion were renamed milpengő (which stands for million pengő) and the indicated value was reduced by a factor of one million. The next denomination after the one billion pengő note became the 10,000 milpengő, which was equal to ten thousand million pengő, and had a similar design to the 10,000 pengő note. The aim was to ease everyday money handling and accounting as well as to reuse the designs of earlier banknotes with little changes.

==== B.-pengő notation: 1 trillion (short scale) pengő ====
After the one billion ("milliárd") milpengő note, a new abbreviation had to be used, since further higher denominations were necessary. This became the b.-pengő, which stands for billion pengő; where billion is on the long scale (i.e. - one million million, or 10^{12} pengő, rather than the short scale 10^{9}, which is "milliárd" in Hungarian). The designs were reused again with changes to the color and the addition of the "B" prefix. The highest printed denomination – the one billion ("milliárd") b.-pengő (i.e. - 10^{21}, 1 sextillion pengő) note – was never released into circulation, but is widely recognized as the highest-denomination government-backed note ever printed. (Though not the one with the most zeros—see Banknotes of Zimbabwe § Banknotes of the third dollar (ZWR).)

This naming scheme and reuse of the designs is the reason for the cyclic pattern in the hyperinflation pengő notes. The cycle was 6 digit, meaning that notes with the same number before the denomination (e.g. 10,000 pengő, 10,000 milpengő, 10,000, b.-pengő) had the same design, though printed in a different color.

1945–1946 series
Image		Value	Dimensions	Description		Date of		
Obverse	Reverse	Value	Dimensions	Obverse	Reverse	printing	issue	withdrawal
		50 pengő	175 × 90 mm	Portrait of Ferenc II Rákóczi by Ádám Mányoki	Károly Lotz's painting: "Stallions in the shower"	5 April 1945	5 June 1945	6 May 1946
Hungarian 100 Pengo - Front	Hungarian 100 Pengo - Back	100 pengő	183 × 97 mm	Portrait of King Matthias Corvinus by Giovanni Antonio Boltraffio	View of the Buda Castle with the Danube	5 April 1945	9 May 1945	6 May 1946
Hungarian 500 Pengo - Front	Hungarian 500 Pengo - Back	500 pengő	177 × 86 mm	Female model	Value in different languages	15 May 1945	1 June 1945	6 May 1946
Hungarian 1000 Pengo - Front	Hungarian 1000 Pengo - Back	1,000 pengő	185 × 90 mm	Female model	Value in different languages	15 July 1945	16 July 1945	31 December 1945
		1,000 pengő (red adhesive stamp)	185 × 90 mm	Female model	Value in different languages	15 July 1945	19 December 1945	6 May 1946
		10,000 pengő	171 × 82 mm	Female model	Value in different languages	15 July 1945	17 October 1945	31 December 1945
		10,000 pengő (brown adhesive stamp)	171 × 82 mm	Female model	Value in different languages	15 July 1945	19 December 1945	5 July 1946
		100,000 pengő	179 × 81 mm	Valéria Rudas Female model from Bény	Coat of arms and value in different languages	23 October 1945	12 December 1945	31 December 1945
		100,000 pengő (green adhesive stamp)	179 × 81 mm	Valéria Rudas Female model from Bény	Coat of arms and value in different languages	23 October 1945	19 December 1945	31 January 1946
		100,000 pengő (2nd issue)	179 × 81 mm	Valéria Rudas Female model from Bény	Coat of arms and value in different languages	23 October 1945	27 December 1945	5 July 1946
Hungarian 1M Pengo - Front	Hungarian 1M Pengo - Back	1,000,000 pengő	167 × 84 mm	Lajos Kossuth	Géza Mészöly's painting: "Balaton scene"	16 November 1945	28 February 1946	24 June 1946
		10,000,000 pengő (10^{7} pengő)	184 × 84 mm	Lajos Kossuth	Dove carrying an olive branch	16 November 1945	2 April 1946	24 June 1946
Hungarian 100M Pengo - Front	Hungarian 100M Pengo - Back	100,000,000 pengő (10^{8} pengő)	159 × 79 mm	Female model	The Hungarian Parliament Building	18 March 1946	30 April 1946	10 July 1946
		1,000,000,000 pengő 1 billion (short scale) pengő (10^{9} pengő)	174 × 84 mm	Lúcia Lendvay Female model from Székesfehérvár	Value	18 March 1946	13 May 1946	10 July 1946
		10,000 milpengő 10 billion pengő (10^{10} pengő)	171 × 82 mm	Female model	Value	29 April 1946	27 May 1946	31 July 1946
		100,000 milpengő 100 billion pengő (10^{11} pengő)	179 × 81 mm	Valéria Rudas Female model from Bény	Coat of arms and value	29 April 1946	3 June 1946	31 July 1946
		1,000,000 milpengő 1 trillion (short scale) pengő (10^{12} pengő)	167 × 84 mm	Lajos Kossuth	Géza Mészöly's painting: "Balaton scene"	24 May 1946	12 June 1946	31 July 1946
		10,000,000 milpengő 10 trillion pengő (10^{13} pengő)	184 × 84 mm	Lajos Kossuth	Dove carrying an olive branch	24 May 1946	18 June 1946	31 July 1946
		100,000,000 milpengő 100 trillion pengő (10^{14} pengő)	159 × 79 mm	Female model	The Hungarian Parliament Building	3 June 1946	24 June 1946	31 July 1946
		1,000,000,000 milpengő 1 quadrillion (short scale) pengő (10^{15} pengő)	174 × 84 mm	Lúcia Lendvay Female model from Székesfehérvár	Value	3 June 1946	27 June 1946	31 July 1946
		10,000 b.‑pengő 10 quadrillion pengő (10^{16} pengő)	171 × 82 mm	Female model	Value	3 June 1946	1 July 1946	31 July 1946
		100,000 b.‑pengő 100 quadrillion pengő (10^{17} pengő)	179 × 81 mm	Valéria Rudas Female model from Bény	Coat of arms and value	3 June 1946	2 July 1946	31 July 1946
		1,000,000 b.‑pengő 1 quintillion (short scale) pengő (10^{18} pengő)	167 × 84 mm	Lajos Kossuth	Géza Mészöly's painting: "Balaton scene"	3 June 1946	4 July 1946	31 July 1946
		10,000,000 b.‑pengő 10 quintillion pengő (10^{19} pengő)	184 × 84 mm	Lajos Kossuth	Dove carrying an olive branch	3 June 1946	8 July 1946	31 July 1946
		100,000,000 b.‑pengő 100 quintillion pengő (10^{20} pengő)	159 × 79 mm	Female model	The Hungarian Parliament Building	3 June 1946	11 July 1946	31 July 1946
		1,000,000,000 b.‑pengő 1 sextillion (short scale) pengő (10^{21} pengő)	174 × 84 mm	Lúcia Lendvay Female model from Székesfehérvár	Value	3 June 1946	Never	
These images are to scale at 0.7 pixel per millimetre (18 pixel per inch). For table standards, see the banknote specification table.

== Soviet Red Army issues ==
In 1944, during the Soviet occupation of Hungary, the Red Army issued paper money without cover in the areas under its control. These banknotes were of poor quality, easily counterfeited, and aggravated the inflation of the pengő. They featured the text "A Vöröshadsereg parancsnoksága pengő" (The Red Army Command's pengő).

Red Army series
Image		Value	Dimensions	Description		Date of	
Obverse	Reverse	Value	Dimensions	Obverse	Reverse	issue	withdrawal
		1 pengő	135 × 70 mm	Value		1944	28 February 1946
		2 pengő	138 × 69 mm	Value		1944	28 February 1946
		5 pengő	135 × 67 mm	Value		1944	28 February 1946
		10 pengő	161 × 81 mm	Value		1944	28 February 1946
		20 pengő	165 × 84 mm	Value		1944	28 February 1946
		50 pengő	179 × 90 mm	Value		1944	28 February 1946
		100 pengő	184 × 97 mm	Value		1944	28 February 1946
		1,000 pengő	194 × 104 mm	Value		1944	28 February 1946
