= Coins of the Hungarian pengő =

Hungarian pengő coins (Hungarian: pengő érmék) were part of the physical form of Hungary's historical currency, the Hungarian pengő. Initially, higher value coins were made of silver to reflect value and stability. Later, during the second world war, these coins were replaced first by banknotes and later by aluminium coins. By the end of 1945, pengő coins completely lost their value due to rampant inflation.

== Prewar series (1926-1940) ==
Before World War II, the fillér and pengő coins were made of bronze (1 and 2 f), cupronickel (10-, 20-, and 50 f), and 640 ‰ fine silver (1-, 2-, and 5 P). Commemorative 2 and 5 pengő coins were issued on anniversaries in large quantities (hundreds of thousands) and were released into circulation. The coins had a Baroque style; the most important designers were János Pálinkás, Lajos Berán, and József Reményi.

Although pengő was based on a gold standard, and the quality standards of gold coins (10 and 20 pengő) were enacted, no gold coins were released into circulation due to the Great Depression.

Prewar series - Regular issues
Image		Value	Technical parameters				Description			Date of		
Obverse	Reverse	Value	Diameter	Thickness	Mass	Composition	Edge	Obverse	Reverse	first minting	issue	withdrawal
		1 f	17.0 mm	1.0 mm	1.66 g	Bronze; 95% copper 4% tin 1% zinc	Smooth	"MAGYAR KIRÁLYSÁG",^{1} Holy Crown of Hungary, year of minting	Value, mintmark	1926	27 December 1926	31 December 1945
		2 f	19.0 mm	1.5 mm	3.33 g	Bronze; 95% copper 4% tin 1% zinc	Smooth	"MAGYAR KIRÁLYSÁG",^{1} Holy Crown of Hungary, year of minting	Value, mintmark	1926	27 December 1926	31 December 1945
		10 f	19.0 mm	1.5 mm	3.0 g	Cupronickel; 75% copper 25% nickel	Smooth	"MAGYAR KIRÁLYSÁG", Holy Crown of Hungary, year of minting	Value, mintmark	1926	27 December 1926	30 April 1942
		20 f	21.0 mm	1.6 mm	4.0 g	Cupronickel; 75% copper 25% nickel	Smooth	"MAGYAR KIRÁLYSÁG", Holy Crown of Hungary, year of minting	Value, mintmark	1926	27 December 1926	30 April 1942
		50 f	22.0 mm	1.7 mm	5.0 g	Cupronickel; 75% copper 25% nickel	Milled	"MAGYAR KIRÁLYSÁG", Holy Crown of Hungary, year of minting	Value, mintmark	1926	27 December 1926	30 April 1942
		1 P	23.0 mm	1.5 mm	5.0 g	640‰ silver	Incused	"MAGYAR KIRÁLYSÁG", coat of arms, year of minting	Value, mintmark	1926	27 December 1926	31 January 1942
		2 P	27.0 mm	2.1 mm	10.0 g	640‰ silver	Incused	"MAGYAR KIRÁLYSÁG", coat of arms with angels, value, mintmark	"MAGYARORSZÁG VÉDASSZONYA",^{2} Madonna and Child, year of minting	1929	25 June 1930	31 January 1942
		5 P	36.0 mm	3.0 mm	25.0 g	640‰ silver	Incused	"MAGYAR KIRÁLYSÁG", coat of arms with angels, value, mintmark, year of minting	"VITÉZ NAGYBÁNYAI HORTHY MIKLÓS MAGYARORSZÁG KORMÁNYZÓJA",^{3} Miklós Horthy	1938	15 March 1939	31 October 1945
		10 P (trial strike)	18.0 mm	? mm	2.9239765 g	900‰ gold	Milled	"MAGYAR KIRÁLYSÁG", coat of arms with angels, year of minting	Value, mintmark	1927	never	-
		20 P (trial strike)	20.0 mm	? mm	5.8479531 g	900‰ gold	Milled	"MAGYAR KIRÁLYSÁG", coat of arms with angels, year of minting	Value, mintmark	1927	never	-
Prewar series - Commemorative issues
		2 P	27.0 mm	2.1 mm	10.0 g	640‰ silver	Incused	"MAGYAR KIRÁLYSÁG", coat of arms, value, year of minting, mintmark	"A 300 ÉVES KIR PÁZMÁNY PÉTER TUD EGYETEM ALAPÍTÁSÁNAK EMLÉKÉRE",^{4} Péter Pázmány with two students	1935	25 September 1935	31 January 1942
		2 P	27.0 mm	2.1 mm	10.0 g	640‰ silver	Incused	"MAGYAR KIRÁLYSÁG", coat of arms, value, year of minting, mintmark	"II RÁKÓCZI FERENC 1676-1735", Francis II Rákóczi	1935	31 December 1935	31 January 1942
		2 P	27.0 mm	2.1 mm	10.0 g	640‰ silver	Incused	"MAGYAR KIRÁLYSÁG", coat of arms, value, year of minting, mintmark	"LISZT FERENC A NAGY MAGYAR ZENEKÖLTŐ EMLÉKÉRE",^{5} "1811-1886", Franz Liszt	1936	10 August 1936	31 January 1942
		5 P	36.0 mm	3.0 mm	25.0 g	640‰ silver	Milled	"MAGYAR KIRÁLYSÁG", coat of arms with angels, value, mintmark	"VITÉZ NAGYBÁNYAI HORTHY MIKLÓS KORMÁNYZÓSÁGÁNAK 10 ÉVFORDULÓJÁRA",^{6} Miklós Horthy, year of minting	1930	25 June 1930	31 October 1945
		5 P	36.0 mm	3.0 mm	25.0 g	640‰ silver	Incused	"MAGYAR KIRÁLYSÁG", coat of arms, value, mintmark, year of minting	"SZT ISTVÁN", "969-1038", Stephen I of Hungary	1938	12 August 1938	31 October 1945
These images are to scale at 2.5 pixels per millimeter, a standard for world coins. For table standards, see the coin specification table.

== War series (1940-1944) ==
As a consequence of the war, the government recalled the silver pengő coins (deadline: 31 January 1942) to prevent personal hoarding. These were replaced by newly designed aluminium coins. Later the cupronickel 10, 20 and 50 fillér coins were recalled as well, moreover, even the bronze 1 and 2 fillér coins disappeared after a time. First, they were replaced by steel, later - in the case of the 2 fillér - with zinc coins. The war coins were redesigned by Lajos Berán. As the war escalated, none of the above metals was cheap enough to mint coins. The solution was the issuing of low denomination paper money (see there).

War series - Regular issues
Image		Value	Technical parameters				Description			Date of		
Obverse	Reverse	Value	Diameter	Thickness	Mass	Composition	Edge	Obverse	Reverse	first minting	issue	withdrawal
		2 f	19.0 mm	1.6 mm	3.33 g	Steel	Smooth	"MAGYAR KIRÁLYSÁG", Holy Crown of Hungary, year of minting	Value, mintmark	1940	4 November 1940	30 April 1941
		2 f	19.0 mm	1.6 mm	3.33 g	Steel	Brim striated Edge smooth	"MAGYAR KIRÁLYSÁG", Holy Crown of Hungary, year of minting	Value, mintmark	1940	20 January 1941	31 December 1945
		2 f	17.0 mm	2.0 mm	2.0 g	Zinc	Smooth	"MAGYAR KIRÁLYSÁG", Holy Crown of Hungary, year of minting	Value, mintmark	1943	17 February 1943	31 December 1945
		10 f	20.0 mm	1.4 mm	3.0 g	Steel	Smooth	"MAGYAR KIRÁLYSÁG", Holy Crown of Hungary, year of minting	Value, mintmark	1940	4 November 1940	31 December 1945
		20 f	21.0 mm hole: 5.0 mm	1.7 mm	3.6 g	Steel	Smooth	"MAGYAR KIRÁLYSÁG", Holy Crown of Hungary, year of minting	Value, mintmark	1941	11 November 1941	31 December 1945
		1 P	23.7 mm	1.6 mm	1.5 g	Aluminium	Milled	"MAGYAR KIRÁLYSÁG", coat of arms	Value, mintmark, year of minting	1941	9 June 1941	31 December 1945
		2 P	28.0 mm	2.3 mm	2.8 g	Aluminium	Milled	"MAGYAR KIRÁLYSÁG", coat of arms, year of minting	Value, mintmark	1941	9 June 1941	31 December 1945
War series - Commemorative issue
		5 P	36.0 mm	2.6 mm	6.0 g	Aluminium	Milled	"MAGYAR KIRÁLYSÁG", coat of arms with angels, value, mintmark, year of minting	"VITÉZ NAGYBÁNYAI HORTHY MIKLÓS MAGYARORSZÁG KORMÁNYZÓJA SZÜLETÉSÉNEK 75 ÉVFORDULÓJÁRA",^{7} Miklós Horthy	1943	8 June 1943	31 October 1945
These images are to scale at 2.5 pixels per millimeter, a standard for world coins. For table standards, see the coin specification table.

== Postwar series (1945) ==
Only an aluminium 5-pengő-coin was minted under the postwar government. Due to the rampant inflation, all coins were withdrawn from circulation by the end of 1945.

Postwar series - Regular issue
Image		Value	Technical parameters				Description			Date of		
Obverse	Reverse	Value	Diameter	Thickness	Mass	Composition	Edge	Obverse	Reverse	first minting	issue	withdrawal
		5 P	32.0 mm	2.6 mm	4.5 g	Aluminium	Milled	Coat of arms, value, mintmark, year of minting	"MAGYAR ÁLLAMI VÁLTÓPÉNZ",^{8} Hungarian Parliament Building	1945	1 September 1945	31 December 1945
These images are to scale at 2.5 pixels per millimeter, a standard for world coins. For table standards, see the coin specification table.

- (in Hungarian) www.numismatics.hu
- (in Hungarian) www.penzportal.hu

== Remarks ==
1. "MAGYAR KIRÁLYSÁG" = "Kingdom of Hungary"
2. "MAGYARORSZÁG VÉDASSZONYA" = "Patroness of Hungary"
3. "VITÉZ NAGYBÁNYAI HORTHY MIKLÓS MAGYARORSZÁG KORMÁNYZÓJA" = "Vitéz Miklós Horthy de Nagybánya, Regent of Hungary"
4. "A 300 ÉVES KIR PÁZMÁNY PÉTER TUD EGYETEM ALAPÍTÁSÁNAK EMLÉKÉRE" = "Anniversary of the establishment of the 300-year-old Péter Pázmány University of Sciences"
5. "LISZT FERENC A NAGY MAGYAR ZENEKÖLTŐ EMLÉKÉRE" = "To the memory of Franz Liszt, the great Hungarian composer"
6. "VITÉZ NAGYBÁNYAI HORTHY MIKLÓS KORMÁNYZÓSÁGÁNAK 10 ÉVFORDULÓJÁRA" = "To the 10th anniversary of the regency of Vitéz Miklós Horthy de Nagybánya"
7. "VITÉZ NAGYBÁNYAI HORTHY MIKLÓS MAGYARORSZÁG KORMÁNYZÓJA SZÜLETÉSÉNEK 75 ÉVFORDULÓJÁRA" = "To the 75th anniversary of the birth of Vitéz Miklós Horthy de Nagybánya, Regent of Hungary"
8. "MAGYAR ÁLLAMI VÁLTÓPÉNZ" = "Hungarian state (or treasury) change money"
