= Paper money of the Hungarian korona =

The paper money of the Hungarian korona was part of the circulating currency in the post-World War I Kingdom of Hungary until the introduction of the pengő in 1927. The variety of the banknotes and treasury notes and the variety of issuing authorities reflect the chaotic postwar situation in the country.

== Austro-Hungarian Bank notes (1919) ==
The Austro-Hungarian Bank, the central bank of Austria-Hungary, had the exclusive patent to print banknotes throughout the Austro-Hungarian Empire. Banknotes were printed in Vienna, Hungary was supplied from there. During the First World War, the chief secretary of the Vienna headquarters intentionally suspended the delivery of banknotes to Hungary.

After the World War, the Hungarian Károlyi government requested the Austro-Hungarian Bank to deliver printing plates and banknote paper to Hungary, since it would have been too dangerous to deliver printed banknotes due to the political uncertainty. The banknotes (1, 2, 25 and 200 crowns) printed in Budapest under the Károlyi government and then under the Hungarian Soviet Republic were distinguished with a different serial number (1 K: higher than 7000; 2 K: higher than 7000; 25 K: higher than 3000; 200 K: higher than 2000). After the fall of the Soviet Republic, Vienna declared these banknotes to be counterfeits.

Austro-Hungarian Bank notes
Image		Value	Dimensions	Description		Date of	
Obverse	Reverse	Value	Dimensions	Obverse	Reverse	issue	withdrawal
		1 crown	112 × 67 mm	Classic architecture pattern	Phrygian head	30 April 1919	14 March 1922
		2 crowns	123 × 83 mm	Female models	Female models	25 May 1919	31 December 1922
		25 crowns	135 × 80 mm	Female model	Plain or wavy pattern	25 April 1919	11 November 1920
		200 crowns	167 × 99 mm	Female model	Plain or wavy pattern	20 May 1919	11 November 1920
These images are to scale at 0.7 pixel per millimetre. For table standards, see the banknote specification table.

== Postal Savings Bank notes (1919) ==
The Postal Savings Bank notes (Postatakarékpénztári jegy) were issued under the decree of the Revolutionary Governing Council of the Hungarian Soviet Republic by the Magyar Postatakarékpénztár (Hungarian Postal Savings Bank), which was acting as the emission bank of Hungary then. The prewar high denomination banknotes of the Austro-Hungarian Bank were deposited at par to prevent inflation.

Postal Savings Bank notes
Image		Value	Dimensions	Description		Date of	
Obverse	Reverse	Value	Dimensions	Obverse	Reverse	issue	withdrawal
		5 korona	132 × 80 mm	Male model	"Bill of the Hungarian Postal Savings Bank"	6 June 1919	28 January 1923
		10 korona	140 × 88 mm	Phrygian head	Value	23 July 1919	28 January 1923
		20 korona	145 × 90 mm	Phrygian head	Value in different languages	23 July 1919	28 January 1923
		100 korona	168 × 120 mm	Male model	Value in different languages	never	-
		1,000 korona	200 × 134 mm	Allegoric composition	Value in different languages	never	-
These images are to scale at 0.7 pixel per millimetre. For table standards, see the banknote specification table.

== Overstamped Austro-Hungarian Bank notes (1920) ==
Hungary was the last country among the successor states of the Monarchy to execute overstamping of the common money. The Károlyi government planned to start it on 21 March 1919, but the establishment of the Soviet Republic postponed these plans. Finally, the banknotes (the denominations from 10 to 10,000 crowns) were overstamped from 18 March 1920. Hungary used a red, round stamp to mark the banknotes.

Overstamped Austro-Hungarian Bank notes
Image		Value	Dimensions	Description		Date of	
Obverse	Reverse	Value	Dimensions	Obverse	Reverse	issue	withdrawal
		10 crown	150 × 79 mm	boy model	boy model	24 July 1916	31 January 1924
		20 crowns 2nd issue	150 × 89 mm	female model	female model	28 October 1918	31 January 1924
		25 crowns	135 × 80 mm	female model	plain or wavy pattern	25 April 1919	11 November 1920
		50 crowns	162 × 100 mm	female model	female model	18 December 1916	31 January 1924
		100 crowns	163 × 107 mm	female model	female model	13 December 1912	30 September 1922
		200 crowns		female model			
		1,000 crowns	191 × 127 mm	female model	female model	2 January 1903	31 August 1921
		10,000 crowns	191 × 127 mm	female model	female model	19 December 1918	5 June 1921

== State notes (1920-1926) ==
State notes were first issued in 1921. The designer was Ferenc Helbing. The banknotes were first printed in Switzerland by Orell Füssli, Zürich (except for the lower denominations, which were not worth counterfeiting) then in Hungary by the newly founded Banknote Printing Co. (Magyar Pénzjegynyomda Rt.) in Budapest. The banknote size was increasing with the higher denominations, which prompted the press to resize the banknotes: from 1923, smaller versions were printed with the same (or slightly different) design.

Main state note printing mark variations:

- Low denomination bills (1 to 20 K, printed in 1920): no mark (printed in Budapest by different printers)
- Large size bills (50 to 25,000 K, printed in 1920 and 1922): ORELL FÜSSLI ZÜRICH
- Small size bills (100 to 1,000,000 K, printed in 1923 and 1923): ORELL FÜSSLI ZÜRICH or Magyar Pénzjegynyomda Rt. Budapest. or no mark (printed by the Magyar Pénzjegynyomda Rt. in Budapest)
- All large and small size notes (50 to 1,000,000 K): T. W. or W or T. WILLI to show the name of the inventor of the photo guilloche technique used to print the state notes (Traugott Willi ??? he prepared line drawing for a Swiss franc banknote )

Printer marks on korona state notes
ORELL FÜSSLI ZÜRICH printer mark on a 50 korona (1920) state note
Magyar Pénzjegynyomda Rt. Budapest. printer mark on a 100 korona (1923) state note
T. W. printer mark on a 100 korona (1923) state note

Low denomination series
Image		Value	Dimensions	Description		Date of	
Obverse	Reverse	Value	Dimensions	Obverse	Reverse	issue	withdrawal
		1 korona	129 × 65 mm	Female model	Value in Hungarian and 5 foreign languages	11 July 1921	30 June 1927
		2 korona	131 × 76 mm	Peasant reaping wheat	Value in Hungarian and 5 foreign languages	11 July 1921	30 June 1927
		10 korona	135 × 79 mm	The Széchenyi Chain Bridge	Value in Hungarian and 5 foreign languages	11 July 1921	30 June 1927
		20 korona	143 × 84 mm	The Matthias Church, the Fisherman's Bastion, and the statue of János Hunyadi in the Buda Castle	Value in Hungarian and 5 foreign languages	11 July 1921	30 June 1927
Large size series
Image		Value	Dimensions	Description		Date of	
Obverse	Reverse	Value	Dimensions	Obverse	Reverse	issue	withdrawal
		50 korona	150 × 95 mm	Portrait of Ferenc II Rákóczi by Ádám Mányoki	Value in Hungarian and 5 foreign languages	11 July 1921	30 June 1927
		100 korona	155 × 100 mm	King Matthias	Value in Hungarian and 5 foreign languages	9 May 1921	31 July 1926
		500 korona	170 × 110 mm	Prince Árpád	Value in Hungarian and 5 foreign languages	9 May 1921	31 July 1926
		1000 korona	193 × 125 mm	King St. Stephen	Value in Hungarian and 5 foreign languages	9 May 1921	31 July 1926
		5000 korona	205 × 135 mm	Hunnia	Value in Hungarian and 5 foreign languages	9 May 1921	31 July 1926
		10000 korona	211 × 144 mm	"PATRONA HUNGARIAE"	Value in Hungarian and 5 foreign languages	9 May 1921	31 July 1926
		25000 korona	213 × 147 mm	"PATRONA HUNGARIAE"	Value in Hungarian and 5 foreign languages	6 September 1922	31 July 1926
Small size series
Image		Value	Dimensions	Description		Date of	
Obverse	Reverse	Value	Dimensions	Obverse	Reverse	issue	withdrawal
		100 korona	119 × 72 mm	King Matthias	Value in Hungarian and 5 foreign languages	18 March 1924	30 June 1927
		500 korona	128 × 74 mm	Prince Árpád	Value in Hungarian and 5 foreign languages	20 June 1924	30 June 1927
		1000 korona	136 × 78 mm	King St. Stephen	Value in Hungarian and 5 foreign languages	15 September 1923	30 June 1927
		5000 korona	139 × 83 mm	Hunnia	Value in Hungarian and 5 foreign languages	18 March 1924	30 June 1927
		10000 korona	145 × 88 mm	"PATRONA HUNGARIAE"	Value in Hungarian and 5 foreign languages	18 March 1924	30 June 1927
		25000 korona	145 × 98 mm	King St. Ladislaus	Value in Hungarian and 5 foreign languages	19 May 1924	30 June 1927
		50,000 korona	165 × 105 mm	Female model	Value in Hungarian and 5 foreign languages	16 July 1923	30 June 1927
		100,000 korona	165 × 105 mm	Female model	Value in Hungarian and 5 foreign languages	30 July 1923	30 June 1927
		500,000 korona	185 × 85 mm	Female model	Value in Hungarian and 5 foreign languages	23 February 1924	30 June 1928
		1,000,000 korona	185 × 85 mm	Female model	Value in Hungarian and 5 foreign languages	31 March 1924	30 June 1928
These images are to scale at 0.7 pixel per millimetre. For table standards, see the banknote specification table.

After 25 August 1926 the 1,000 to 1,000,000 korona banknotes were overstamped to show the value in pengő (at the rate of 12500 korona to 1 pengő).

State notes overstamped to pengő value
1000 korona 8 fillér (0.08 pengő)	5000 korona 40 fillér (0.40 pengő)	10000 korona 80 fillér (0.80 pengő)	25000 korona 2 pengő
50000 korona 4 pengő	100000 korona 8 pengő	500000 korona 40 pengő	1000000 korona 80 pengő
