= Mészöly =

Mészöly is a Hungarian surname. Notable people with the surname include:

- Géza Mészöly (footballer) (born 1967), Hungarian international football (soccer) player, son of Kálmán Mészöly
- Géza Mészöly (painter) (1844–1887), Hungarian Romantic painter
- Kálmán Mészöly (1941–2022), Hungarian football (soccer) player and coach, father of Géza Mészöly
