= Coins of the Austro-Hungarian krone =

The coins of the Austro-Hungarian krone were minted with a different design (but the same technical parameters) in Austria and Hungary.

== Coins of Austria ==
The Austrian coins were minted in Vienna, and came in face values of 1, 2, 10, and 20 heller; and 1, 2, 5, 10, 20, and 100 kronen. The Austrian 100-krone coin is still being minted, with a 1915 mint mark to enable Austrians to take advantage of a grandfather clause in the law regarding private ownership of gold bullion.

== Coins of Hungary ==
The Hungarian coins were minted in the famous mint of Körmöcbánya (now Kremnica, Slovakia). Hungarian coins were minted with face values of 1, 2, 10 and 20 fillér; and 1, 2, 5, 10, 20 and 100 korona.

Korona-fillér coins – Regular issues
Image		Value	Technical parameters				Description			Date of first minting
Obverse	Reverse	Value	Diameter	Thickness	Mass	Composition	Edge	Obverse	Reverse	Date of first minting
		1 f	17 mm	1.1 mm	1.67 g	Bronze; 95% copper 4% tin 1% zinc	Smooth	"MAGYAR KIRÁLYI VÁLTÓPÉNZ"^{1}, Holy Crown of Hungary, year of minting	Value, mintmark	1892
		2 f	19 mm	1.5 mm	3.33 g	Bronze; 95% copper 4% tin 1% zinc	Smooth	"MAGYAR KIRÁLYI VÁLTÓPÉNZ"^{1}, Holy Crown of Hungary, year of minting	Value, mintmark	1892
		2 f	17.3 mm	1.7 mm	2.78 g	Iron	Smooth	"MAGYAR KIRÁLYI VÁLTÓPÉNZ", Holy Crown of Hungary, year of mining	Value, mintmark	1916
		10 f	19.0 mm	1.4 mm	3.0 g	Nickel	Serrated	"MAGYAR KIRÁLYI VÁLTÓPÉNZ", Holy Crown of Hungary, year of mining	Value, mintmark	1892
		10 f	19.0 mm	1.4 mm	3.0 g	Alpacca; 50% copper 40% zinc 10% nickel	Serrated	"MAGYAR KIRÁLYI VÁLTÓPÉNZ", Holy Crown of Hungary, year of mining	Value, mintmark	1914
		10 f	19.0 mm	1.5 mm	3.0 g	Iron	Serrated	"MAGYAR KIRÁLYI VÁLTÓPÉNZ", Holy Crown of Hungary, year of mining	Value, mintmark	1916 (1915)
		20 f	21.0 mm	1.6 mm	4.0 g	Nickel	Serrated	"MAGYAR KIRÁLYI VÁLTÓPÉNZ", Holy Crown of Hungary, year of mining	Value, mintmark	1892
		20 f	21.0 mm	1.5 mm	3.33 g	Iron	Smooth	"MAGYAR KIRÁLYI VÁLTÓPÉNZ", Holy Crown of Hungary, year of mining	Value, mintmark	1916
		1 K	23.0 mm	1.5 mm	5.0 g	835‰ silver	"BIZALMAM AZ ŐSI ERÉNYBEN"^{2}, ornament	"FERENCZ JÓZSEF I.K.A.CS. ÉS M.H.S.D.O.AP.KIR."^{3}, I. Ferenc József, mintmark	Holy Crown of Hungary, value	1892
		1 K	23.0 mm	1.5 mm	5.0 g	835‰ silver	"BIZALMAM AZ ŐSI ERÉNYBEN"^{2}, ornament	"FERENCZ JÓZSEF I.K.A.CS. ÉS M.H.S.D.O.AP.KIR.", I. Ferenc József (older), mintmark	Holy Crown of Hungary, value	1912
		2 K	27.0 mm	2.0 mm	10.0 g	835‰ silver	"BIZALMAM AZ ŐSI ERÉNYBEN"^{2}, ornament	"FERENCZ JÓZSEF I.K.A.CS. ÉS M.H.S.D.O.AP.KIR.", I. Ferenc József, mintmark	Holy Crown of Hungary, value	1912
		5 K	36.0 mm	2.6 mm	24.0 g	900‰ silver	"BIZALMAM AZ ŐSI ERÉNYBEN"^{2}, ornament	"FERENCZ JÓZSEF I.K.A.CS. ÉS M.H.S.D.O.AP.KIR.", I. Ferenc József, mintmark	Holy Crown of Hungary, value	1900
		10 K	19.0 mm	0.9 mm	3.39 g	900‰ gold	ornament	"FERENCZ JÓZSEF I.K.A.CS. ÉS M.H.S.D.O.AP.KIR.", standing I. Ferenc József	Middle Coat of Arms with angels, value, mintmark	1892
		20 K	21.0 mm	1.4 mm	6.78 g	900‰ gold	"BIZALMAM AZ ŐSI ERÉNYBEN", ornament	"FERENCZ JÓZSEF I.K.A.CS. ÉS M.H.S.D.O.AP.KIR.", standing I. Ferenc József	Middle Coat of Arms with angels, value, mintmark	1892
		20 K	21.0 mm	1.4 mm	6.78 g	900‰ gold	"BIZALMAM AZ ŐSI ERÉNYBEN", ornament	"FERENCZ JÓZSEF I.K.A.CS. ÉS M.H.S.D.O.AP.KIR.", standing I. Ferenc József	Middle Coat of Arms (including Bosnia) with angels, value, mintmark	1914
		20 K	21.0 mm	1.4 mm	6.78 g	900‰ gold	"HARCBAN ÉS BÉKÉBEN A NEMZETTEL A HAZÁÉRT"^{4}	"KÁROLY I.K.A.CS. ÉS M.H.SZ.D.O.AP.KIR."^{5}, standing IV. Károly	Middle Coat of Arms (including Bosnia) with angels, value, mintmark	1918
		100 K	37.0 mm	2.0 mm	33.9 g	900‰ gold	"BIZALMAM AZ ŐSI ERÉNYBEN", ornament	"FERENCZ JÓZSEF I.K.A.CS. ÉS M.H.S.D.O.AP.KIR.", standing I. Ferenc József	Middle Coat of Arms with angels, value, mintmark	1907
Korona coins – Commemorative issues
		1 K	23.0 mm	1.5 mm	5.0 g	835‰ silver	"BIZALMAM AZ ŐSI ERÉNYBEN", ornament	"AZ EZERÉVES MAGYARORSZÁG EMLÉKÉRE"^{6}, I. Ferenc József, mintmark, value	Árpád	1896
		5 K	36.0 mm	2.6 mm	24.0 g	900‰ silver	"BIZALMAM AZ ŐSI ERÉNYBEN", ornament	"FERENCZ JÓZSEF I.K.A.CS. ÉS M.H.S.D.O.AP.KIR.", I. Ferenc József	"MEGKORONÁZTATÁSÁNAK NEGYVENEDIK ÉVFORDULÓJÁRA 1867-1907"^{7}, coronation scene, value, mintmark	1907
		100 K	37.0 mm	2.0 mm	33.9 g	900‰ gold	"BIZALMAM AZ ŐSI ERÉNYBEN", ornament	"FERENCZ JÓZSEF I.K.A.CS. ÉS M.H.S.D.O.AP.KIR.", I. Ferenc József	"MEGKORONÁZTATÁSÁNAK NEGYVENEDIK ÉVFORDULÓJÁRA 1867-1907", coronation scene, value, mintmark	1907
These images are to scale at 2.5 pixels per millimeter, a standard for world coins. For table standards, see the coin specification table.

== Remarks ==
1. "MAGYAR KIRÁLYI VÁLTÓPÉNZ" = "Hungarian royal token coin"
2. "BIZALMAM AZ ŐSI ERÉNYBEN" = "My trust in the ancient virtue"
3. "FERENCZ JÓZSEF I.K.A.CS. ÉS M.H.S.D.O.AP.KIR." = "Ferencz József Isten kegyelméből ausztriai császár és Magyar-, Horvát-, Szlavon-, Dalmátországok apostoli királya" = "Franz Joseph by the Grace of God Emperor of Austria and Apostolic King of Hungary, Croatia, Slavonia, Dalmatia"
4. "HARCBAN ÉS BÉKÉBEN A NEMZETTEL A HAZÁÉRT" = "In battle and peace with the nation for the home"
5. "KÁROLY I.K.A.CS. ÉS M.H.SZ.D.O.AP.KIR." = "Károly Isten kegyelméből ausztriai császár és Magyar-, Horvát-, Szlavon-, Dalmátországok apostoli királya" = "Charles by the Grace of God Emperor of Austria and Apostolic King of Hungary, Croatia, Slavonia, Dalmatia"
6. "AZ EZERÉVES MAGYARORSZÁG EMLÉKÉRE" = "To the memory of the 1000-years-old Hungary"
7. "MEGKORONÁZTATÁSÁNAK NEGYVENEDIK ÉVFORDULÓJÁRA 1867-1907" = "To the 40th anniversary of his [i.e. Franz Joseph I] coronation 1867-1907"
