= Austro-Hungarian krone =

Currency of Austria-Hungary, 1892–1918

Native names
Czech	rakousko-uherská koruna
German	österreichisch-ungarische Krone
Hungarian	osztrák–magyar korona
Italian	corona austro-ungarica
Latin	corona austro-hungarica
Polish	korona austro-węgierska
Romanian	coroană austro-ungară
Serbo-Croatian	austrougarska kruna / аустроугарска круна
Slovak	rakúsko-uhorská koruna
Slovene	avstro-ogrska krona
Ukrainian	австро-угорська корона
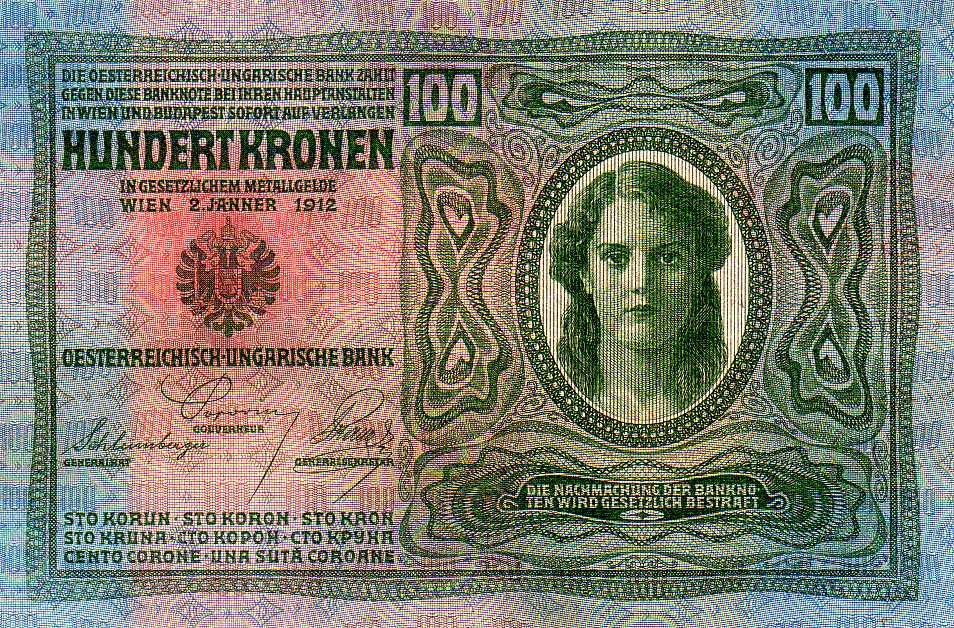
100 K banknote (1912)
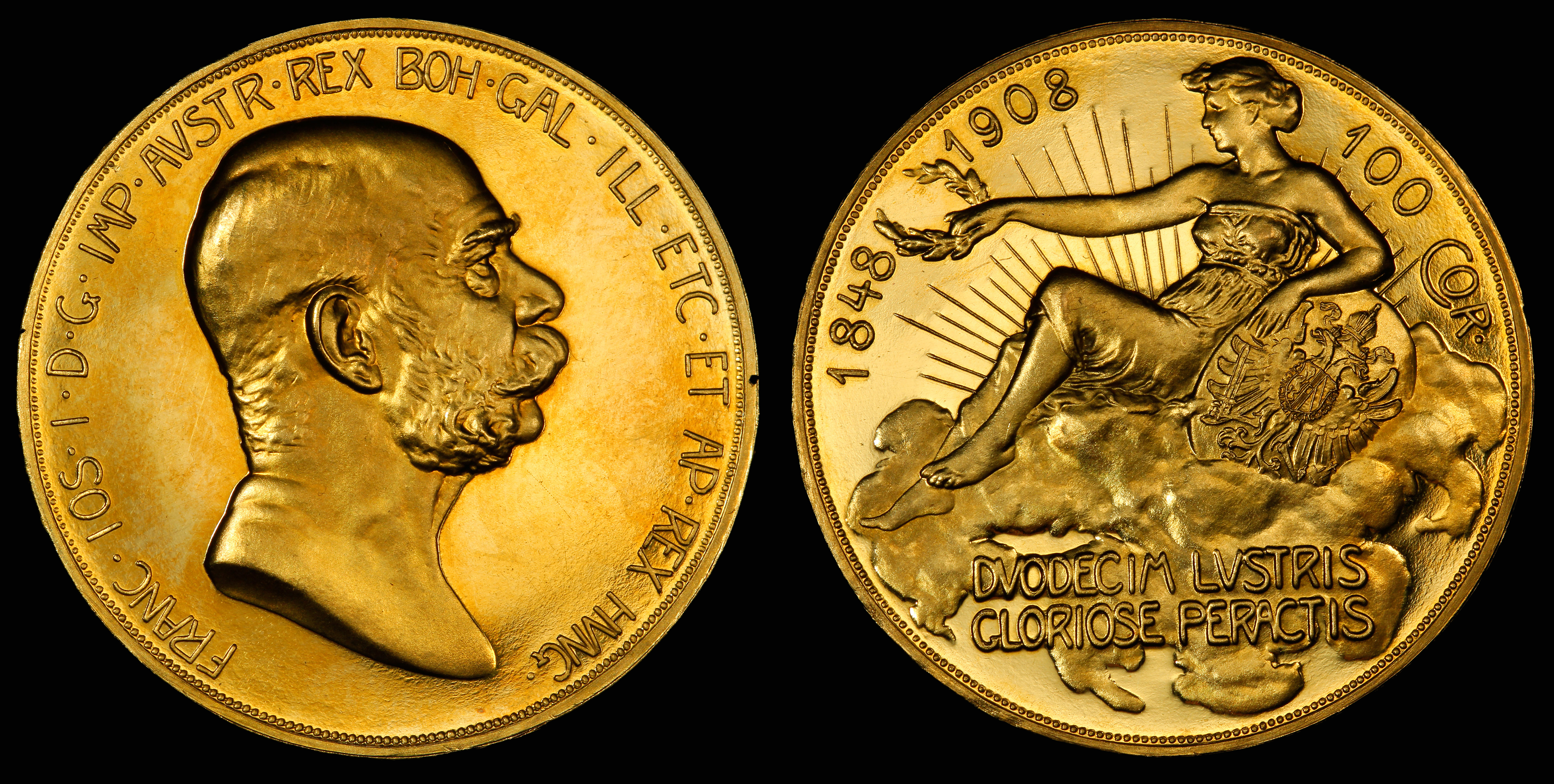
100 K coin (1908)

Units of account
- Plural: kronen (in German)
- Symbol: K, kr
- Subunit
- 1/100: Heller (German); fillér (Hungarian)

Denominations
- Banknotes: 1, 2, 10, 20, 25, 50, 100, 200, 1,000, 10,000 Krone(n)
- Coins: 1, 2, 10, 20 heller / fillér; 1, 2, 5, 10, 20, 100 Krone(n) / korona

Demographics
- Date of introduction: 1892
- Replaced: Austro-Hungarian gulden
- Date of withdrawal: 1918/1919
- User(s): Austria-Hungary; Liechtenstein; Montenegro; Albania; West Ukrainian People's Republic

Issuance
- Central bank: Austro-Hungarian Bank
- This infobox shows the latest status before this currency was rendered obsolete.

The krone (alternatively crown; German: Krone, Hungarian: korona, Italian: corona, Polish: korona, Slovene: krona, Serbo-Croatian: kruna, Czech: koruna, Slovak: koruna, Romanian: coroană, Ukrainian: корона, romanized: korona) was the official currency of Austria-Hungary from 1892 (when it replaced the gulden as part of the adoption of the gold standard) until the dissolution of the empire in 1918. The subunit was one hundredth of the main unit, and was called a Heller in the Austrian and a fillér in the Hungarian part of the Empire. Unlike the preceding silver currency, it was established on a gold basis. One kilogram of fine gold was equivalent to 3,280 crowns. Gold coins, however, were struck only in the values of 10, 20, and 100 crowns, with a purity of 900/1000.

== Name ==
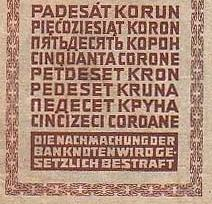
Indication of value in eight languages on a 50 Krone note of 1914

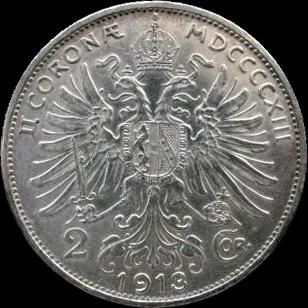
Two coronæ coin, 1913

The official name of the currency was Krone (lit. 'crown', pl. Kronen) in Austria and korona in Hungary. The Latin form Corona (plural Coronæ), abbreviated to Cor. on the smaller coins, was used for the coinage of the mostly German-speaking part of the empire known as Cisleithania. Banknotes had a Cisleithanian obverse side and a Hungarian reverse side. The Hungarian side was in Hungarian language, while on the Cisleithanian side, which was in German language, currency names in other ethnic languages were also recognised and appeared in a designated section of the banknote: koruna (pl. korun) in Czech, korona (pl. korony) in Polish, корона, korona (pl. корон, koron) in Ukrainian, corona (pl. corone) in Italian, krona (pl. krone) in Slovene, kruna/круна (singular and plural) in Serbo-Croatian, koruna (pl. korún) in Slovak, and coroană (pl. coroane) in Romanian. These terms all translate to the English word crown.

The symbol of the currency was the abbreviation K. or sometimes Kr.

== History ==
=== Introduction ===
After several earlier attempts the Austro-Hungarian Empire adopted the gold standard in 1892 according to a plan drawn up by the Hungarian Minister of Finance Sándor Wekerle. This plan included the introduction of the new currency, the Krone. It consisted of 100 Heller (Austria) or Fillér (Hungary). The value of the Krone was set at 2 kronen = 1 gulden. From 1900 onward, Krone notes were the only legal banknotes of the Empire.

=== First World War ===
The currency depreciated sharply as a result of the First World War, which was financed mostly by the issue of War Bonds rather than through taxation. Consumer prices rose sixteenfold during the war, as the government had no hesitation in running the Austro-Hungarian Bank's printing presses to pay its bills: this triggered a higher inflation rate than in other combatant countries.

=== After 1918 ===
==== Austria ====
After the end of the First World War it was initially hoped that the Krone might remain the common currency of the Empire's successor states, but in January 1919 the Kingdom of Serbs, Croats, and Slovenes (later Yugoslavia) became the first successor state to overstamp the Austro-Hungarian Bank's notes, limiting their validity to its own territory. Czechoslovakia followed suit in February 1919, and on 12 March 1919 the new Republic of Austria stamped the notes circulating in its territory with "DEUTSCHÖSTERREICH".

The Austrian economy did not stabilise after the war, and a period of hyperinflation followed: the money supply increased from 12 to 30 billion Kronen in 1920, and to about 147 billion Kronen at the end of 1921. In August 1922 consumer prices were 14,000 times greater than before the start of the war eight years earlier. The highest-denomination banknote issued was the 500,000 Kronen note, issued in 1922. Faith in the currency had been lost, and people spent money as fast as they received it. In October 1922 Austria secured a loan of 650 million gold Kronen from the League of Nations, with a League of Nations Commissioner supervising the country's finances. This stabilized the currency at a rate of 14,400 paper Kronen to 1 gold Krone. On 2 January 1923 the Austrian National Bank (Österreichische Nationalbank) began operations, taking over control of the currency from the Austro-Hungarian Bank which had gone into liquidation.

In December 1923 the Austrian Parliament authorised the government to issue silver 5,000, 10,000, and 20,000-kronen coins which were to be designated half-Schilling, Schilling, and double Schilling. The Schilling became the official currency of Austria currency on 20 December 1924, at a rate of 10,000 Kronen to 1 Schilling.

== Banknotes ==
Banknotes of Austria-Hungary
Pick No.	Front	Back	Year of Issue	Denomination	Additional Notes
Issued by the Austro-Hungarian Bank
1			1880	10 Gulden	
4			1900-1902	10 Kronen	
5			1900-1902	20 Kronen	
6			1900-1902	50 Kronen	
7			1900-1902	100 Kronen	
8a			1900-1902	1000 Kronen	Gray-green underprint.
8b			1900-1902	1000 Kronen	Rose underprint. Later issue from Series #1440 onward.
9			1904-1912	10 Kronen	
10			1904-1912	20 Kronen	
11			1904-1912	100 Kronen	Pictures woman with flowers.
12			1904-1912	100 Kronen	
13			1913-1914	20 Kronen	
14			1913-1914	20 Kronen	Like #13 but with II AUFLAGE (2nd issue) at left border.
15			1913-1914	50 Kronen	
17a			1914-1915	2 Kronen	Thin paper, series A or B. 2 serial # varieties.
17b			1914-1915	2 Kronen	Heavier paper, series C.
19			1914-1915	10 Kronen	
20			1916-1918	1 Krone	
21			1916-1918	2 Kronen	
23			1916-1918	25 Kronen	
24			1916-1918	200 Kronen	
25			1916-1918	10,000 Kronen	
Issued by the Kriegsdarlehenskasse (War Loan Office)
26			1914	250 Kronen	
27			1914	2000 Kronen	
28			1914	10,000 Kronen	
29			1918-1919	1,000 Kronen	

== Coins ==
Coins of the Krone
Denomination	Metal
1 heller	brass
2 heller	brass, iron (1916–8)
5 heller	nickel
10 heller	nickel
20 heller	nickel, iron (1916–8)
1 krone	silver (.835, 5g)
10 krone	gold (.900, 3.22g)
20 krone	gold (.900, 6.78g)

== Over-stamped Austro-Hungarian krone ==
=== Croatia, Slovenia and Bosnia and Herzegovina ===
In these territories of Austria-Hungary, which became part of the Kingdom of the Serbs, Croats and Slovenes (later Yugoslavia) in 1918, Krone banknotes were stamped by the new authorities and became issues of the Serb, Croat and Slovene krone. In 1920 this was replaced by the dinar at a rate of 1 dinar = 4 Kronen.

=== Czechoslovakia ===
In Czechoslovakia the currency was superseded by the Czechoslovak koruna, at par. The names of the present-day koruna and haléř (in the Czech Republic) and the pre-Euro koruna and halier (in Slovakia) are derived from the Austro-Hungarian Krone and Heller.

=== Fiume ===
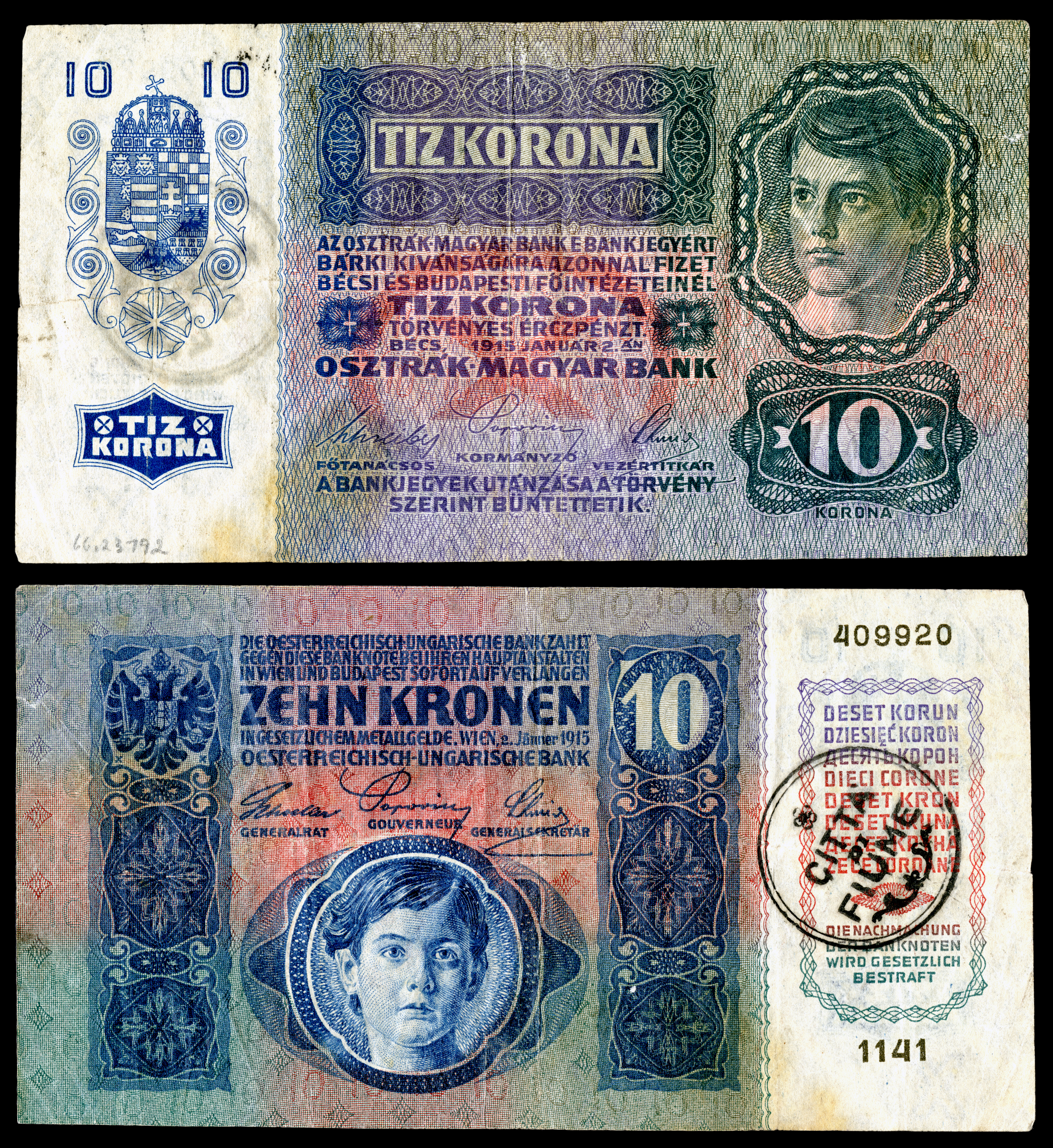
10 Fiume krone provisional banknote (1920)

The Fiume Krone (Corona Fiumana) - (Cor., FiuK) was introduced on 18 April 1919 by over-printing the existing Austro-Hungarian Krone notes, under the authority of the Italian National Council of Fiume who ruled the city. There were two issues: the 1919/21 Issue (1 and 2 kronen), and the 1920 Issue (2, 10, 20, 50, 100, and 1,000 kronen). The over-printed notes were in circulation from April 1919 to February 1921. In September 1920 the Italian Lira was introduced as the official currency. The unofficial exchange rate to the lira was 2.5 FiuK to 1 Lira.

=== Hungary ===
In Hungary the Austro-Hungarian currency was overstamped and then replaced by the Hungarian korona at par. The Hungarian korona was devalued by hyperinflation, due to the consequences of World War I and the Treaty of Trianon. It was replaced by the pengő on 21 January 1927, at a rate of 12,500 korona to 1 pengő.

=== Romania ===
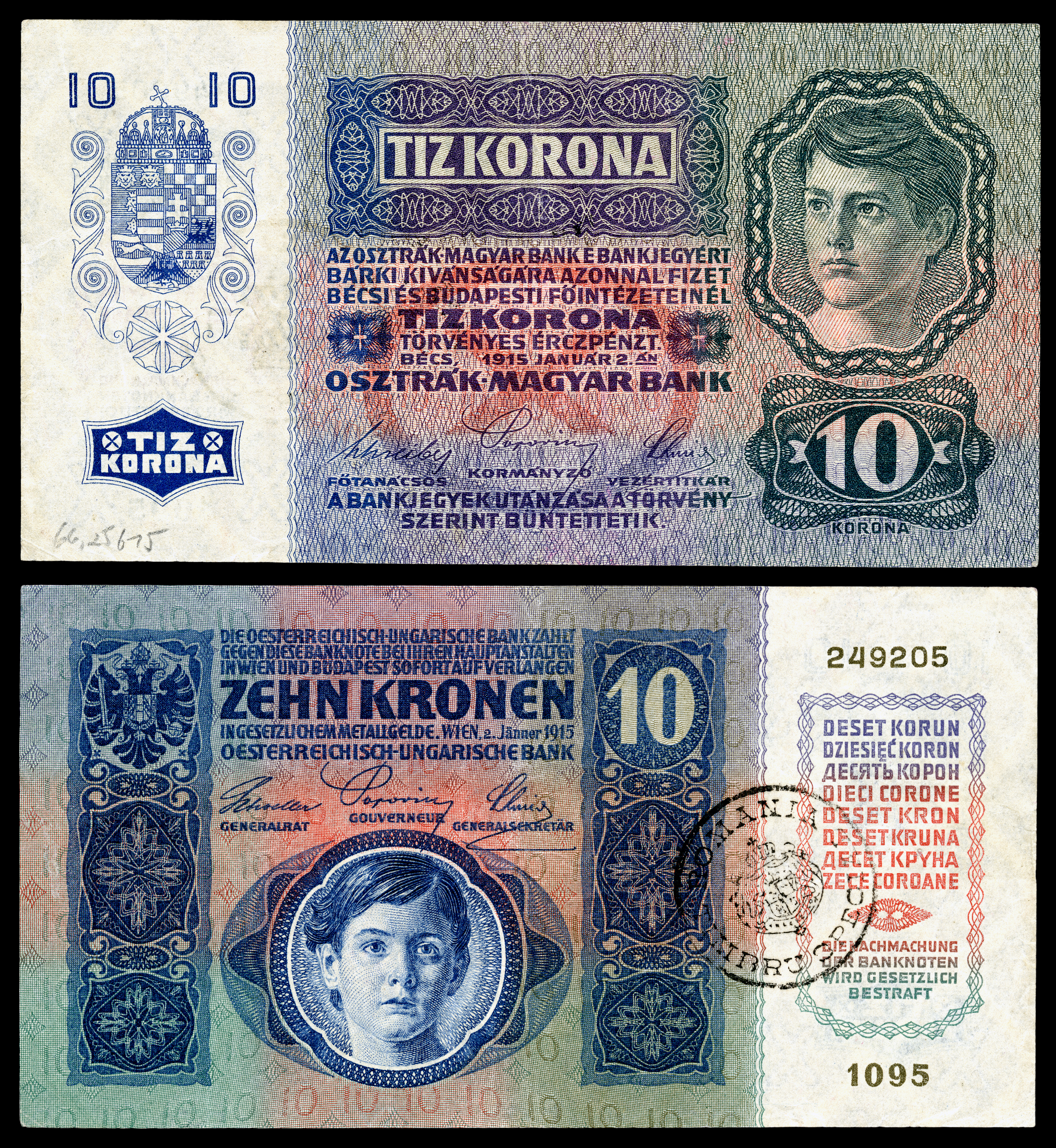
10 Romanian kronen provisional banknote (1919)

In Romania there were two issues of over-stamped notes: the 1919 First Provisional Issue (stamp on the Austrian side of the note), and the 1919 Second Provisional Issue (stamp on the Hungarian side). Both issues included 10, 20, 50, 100, 1000, and 10,000 korona denominations. The issue dates of the base Austro-Hungarian krone notes used ranged from 1902 to 1918.

=== Complete denomination sets of over-stamped notes ===
Complete denomination sets of over-printed Austro-Hungarian krone
Value	Czechoslovak	Hungarian	Size	Base date
10k			150x79mm	
20k			150x89mm	
25k	Not issued		135x80mm	
50k			162x100mm	
100k			163x107mm	
200k	Not issued		168x100mm	
1,000k			191x127mm	
10,000k	Not issued		191x127mm	

== Historic exchange rates and prices ==
Year	Rates
1892	1 kg gold = 3280 Kr.; 1 Kr = 1.05 Swiss francs, 0.8505 German marks.
1896	1 pound sterling = 24 Kr.
1899	1 Kr = 0.7937 German marks.
1900	1 pound sterling = 23.97 Kr.; Kronenzeitung (newspaper) = 4 hellers.
1907	1 Kr = 0.8471 German marks (26 March).
1909	1 Kr = 0.8479 German marks.; 1 Kr = 1.05 Swiss francs = 1.05 French francs = 1.05 Italian lire = 1.05 Romanian lei (Latin Monetary Union)
1913	1 US dollar = 4.96 Kr.; 1 Kr = 0.8481 German marks.; 1.5 kg sugar = 1 Kr.; 1 tram ticket (Vienna) = 19 hellers.
1914	1 US dollar = 5.08 Kr.
1915	1 US dollar = 6.50 Kr.; 1 Kr = 0.7143 German marks.
1916	1 US dollar = 7.95 Kr.; 1 Kr = 0.6896 German marks.
1917	1 Kr = 0.6493 German marks.
1918	1 tram ticket (Vienna) = 40 hellers.; Salzburger Volksbote (newspaper) - January = 14 hellers.; Illustrierte Kronenzeitung (newspaper) - November = 8 hellers.; 1 Kr = 0.5 German marks (November); Telegraf (newspaper) - December = 10 hellers.
1919	1 US dollar = 16.1 Kr (January).; Illustrierte Kronenzeitung - January - June = 10 hellers.; Illustrierte Kronenzeitung - July - December = 12 hellers.; 100 Kr = 11.60 Swiss francs (August).; 1 Kr = 0.3125 German marks (October).; 4 Kr = 1 Yugoslav dinar = 2 Romanian lei (November).; 100 Kr = 2.75 Swiss francs (December).
1921	2,000 Kr = 1 Swiss franc (March).

== Banknotes ==
Krone banknotes were designed and printed in Vienna from 1900 onward. These banknotes were used throughout the Monarchy. All banknotes issued by the Austro-Hungarian Bank were bilingual in German and Hungarian: the denomination was also indicated in other languages of the Monarchy. Until World War I, all banknotes had a German and a Hungarian side; during the war, some banknotes were issued with text in both languages on either side. The designers included Koloman Moser, Rudolf Rössler, Josef Pfeiffer and László Hegedűs. The engraver was Ferdinand Schirnböck.
