= Fillér =

Type of small, old Hungarian coin

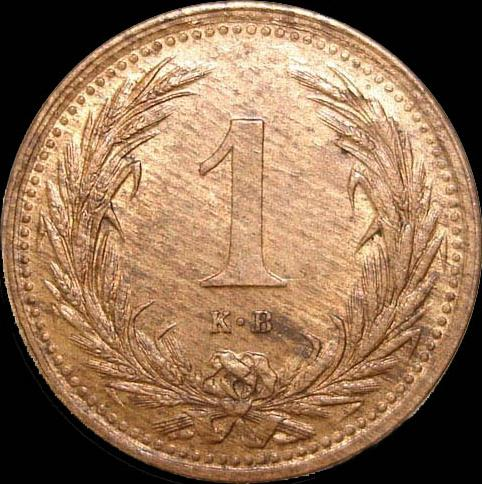
The first fillér (1892)

Fillér (Note: Hungarian pronunciation: [ˈfilleːr]) was the name of various small-denomination coins throughout Hungarian history. It was the 1/100 subdivision of the Austro-Hungarian and the Hungarian korona, the pengő, and the forint. The name derives from the German word vier (four). Originally, it was the name of the four-kreuzer coin.

The fillér coins introduced in 1946 with the forint were worth 2, 5, 10, 20, and 50 fillér. Due to significant inflation that took place after the fall of communism, the fillér coins were slowly removed from circulation coin by coin. The 2- and 5 fillér coins were removed in 1992, although they never had much value from their introduction, and they rarely circulated. The 10- and 20 fillér coins did circulate until the early '90s, and were removed in 1996. The last fillér coin, the 50 fillér (0.5 forint), was removed from circulation in 1999. However, the fillér continues to be used in calculations, for example, in the price of petrol (e.g. 479.9 forint/litre), or in the prices of telephone calls.

== See also ==
- Coins of the Austro-Hungarian krone
- Coins of the Hungarian pengő
- Coins of the Hungarian forint
