= Hungarian one-hundred-quintillion-pengő banknote =

Obsolete Hungarian banknote

One hundred quintillion pengő
- Country: Hungary
- Value: 100 quintillion (1×10^{20}) pengő
- Width: 159 mm
- Height: 79 mm
- Weight: ≈ 1.0 g
- Security features: optically variable ink
- Material used: paper
- Years of printing: June 3, 1946-July 31, 1946

Obverse
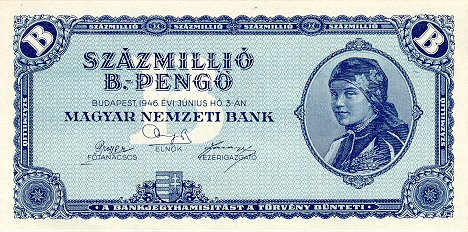
- Design: Hungarian woman
- Design date: 1946

Reverse
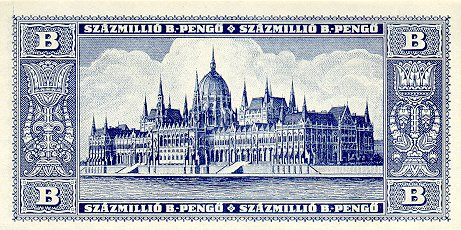
- Design: Hungarian Parliament Building
- Design date: 1946

The one-hundred-quintillion-pengő banknote is one of the highest-denomination banknotes ever circulated, issued in 1946 during Hungary's extreme post-WWII hyperinflation, a period of unprecedented economic chaos where the currency lost value incredibly fast (see Hyperinflation § Hungary or Hungarian pengő § Hyperinflation). This massive note, sometimes called the one hundred million b.-pengő (Hungarian: százmillió b.-pengő), was part of a series symbolizing the peak of this inflation, though an even higher, unissued sextillion pengő note was also printed. The exchange rate of the one-hundred-quintillion-pengő note at the time was approximately $0.20 United States dollars.

== See also ==
- Zimbabwean one hundred trillion dollar note
