= Ferenc Helbing =

Hungarian artist

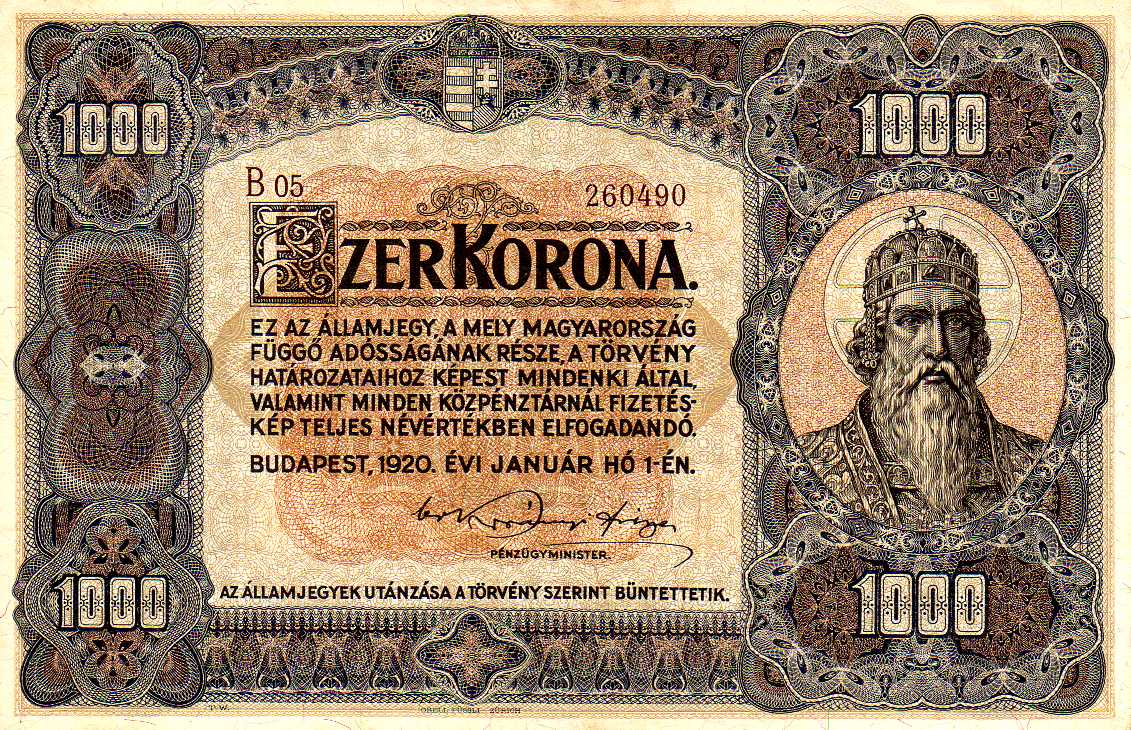
1000 Hungarian korona banknote (1920) designed by Ferenc Helbing

Ferenc Helbing (25 December 1870 – 28 January 1958) was a Hungarian graphic artist and painter.

Helbing was born in Érsekújvár, Kingdom of Hungary (today Nové Zámky, Slovakia). He started his career as a lithographer. After studying applied graphics and applied arts, he became a printing manager. He taught at the College of Applied Graphics (from 1906) then at the College of Applied Arts (from 1910); he managed the latter until 1936. He made a pioneer work in the field of the Hungarian commercial graphics. He was the designer of many Hungarian banknotes. He also created posters, stamps, illustrations for books, glass paintings and murals (e.g. at the Palace Hotel (Palotaszálló) in Lillafüred) and won a number of prizes in applied arts and graphics competitions. Some of his works can be seen in the Hungarian National Gallery.

He died in Budapest.

== See also ==
- Hungarian korona banknotes designed by Ferenc Helbing
- Hungarian pengő banknotes designed by Ferenc Helbing
