= Wealth Tax Commission =

UK expert group

The Wealth Tax Commission in the United Kingdom was a group of experts studying the desirability and feasibility of a wealth tax. The three Commissioners, Arun Advani, Emma Chamberlain and Andy Summers, cooperated with a large network of academics, policymakers and tax practitioners to produce an extensive evidence base on the wealth tax. The Commissioners’ final report was released in December 2020, recommending that, if the government wants to raise more tax revenue, the introduction of a one-off wealth tax (capital levy) would be preferred to increasing other taxes.

== History ==
The COVID-19 recession lead to a sudden fall in economic activity and a massive increase in government spending. In the UK, this resulted in the largest deficit in peacetime history, reinforcing the need to raise taxes in order to repair public finances in the long run. This prompted public debates about a wealth tax, with Advani, Chamberlain and Summers noting that there is not enough evidence on the desirability and practicability of a wealth tax in the UK to take an informed view, which motivated them to set up the Wealth Tax Commission in April 2020.

== Structure ==
The three Wealth Tax Commissioners are Arun Advani, assistant professor of economics at the University of Warwick, Emma Chamberlain OBE, Barrister at Pump Court Tax Chambers, and Andy Summers, associate professor of law at the London School of Economics. They commissioned evidence on all aspects of a wealth tax in the UK from a large international network of more than 50 tax experts with backgrounds in, among other disciplines, economics, law and accounting, resulting in a vast collection of up-to-date papers on wealth taxation that is relevant beyond the UK context. The Wealth Tax Commission is independent from government.

== Policy proposals ==
Building on the evidence presented in the commissioned input papers, the final report of the Wealth Tax Commission recommends the introduction of a one-off wealth tax for the purpose of raising more tax revenue. The report specifically does not advocate hiking taxes at a particular point in time, but rather that, if the government chooses to increase tax receipts, it should prefer a one-off wealth tax to raising taxes on work or spending. The report proposes a design for the one-off wealth tax, arguing that it makes the levy economically efficient, reduces tax avoidance and administrative costs, and raises substantial amounts of revenue in a progressive way. While the Commissioners avoid recommending specific rates or thresholds as these “are archetypal matters of political judgement and democratic deliberation,” the report provides some estimates to illustrate how much revenue a wealth tax with varying rates and thresholds could raise. For example, a 5% one-off wealth tax on individual net assets above £500,000 could collect £260 billion. Individuals could pay the tax in equal annual instalments over a period of five years. Alongside the final report, the commission launched a tax simulator allowing anyone to evaluate the implications for tax receipts when changing thresholds and rates.

Considering an annual wealth tax, the report concludes that it would be much more difficult to implement in an efficient way than a one-off wealth tax because the administrative costs due to more frequent asset valuations and the potential for avoidance would be higher. Thus, the Commission argues that reforming the existing system of wealth taxation should be preferred to introducing an annual wealth tax. The introduction of an annual wealth tax with a high threshold in addition to these reforms could be justifiable in the view of the Commission if the government aims to reduce wealth inequality through tax policy and redistribution, but it does not take a stance on whether that in itself is a desirable goal.

The proposal were discussed controversially by politicians, financial advisers and the media. Some observers agree that the proposed one-off wealth tax would be a powerful tool to raise significant tax revenue in a progressive way. Others argue that it would target the wrong people, including the moderately wealthy, and trigger tax avoidance, so reforming existing taxes on income, expenditure, property and inheritance should be preferred to introducing new levies. Further, the commission's recommendations were subsequently evaluated in a report of the Treasury Select Committee. Mel Stride, chair of the committee, considers the proposal of a one-off wealth tax to be “probably nearer the end of the spectrum of the possible-stroke-question mark-desirable than an annual wealth tax.”
