= Banknotes of the Austro-Hungarian krone =

Paper money of the Austro-Hungarian krone appeared in the beginning of the 20th century - almost ten years after the coins were introduced. All banknotes were bilingual (German and Hungarian), and the value was indicated in eight other languages (Czech, Polish, Croatian, Slovene, Serbian, Italian, Ruthenian (Ukrainian) (Note: Ruthenen was the only official designation given to people living in the Habsburg Empire until its demise in 1918 who were later referred to as Ukrainians.) and Romanian). After the dissolution of the empire banknotes were overstamped to limit their circulation according to the new borders.

1900-1902 Series
Image		Value	Dimensions	Description		Date of		
Obverse	Reverse	Value	Dimensions	Obverse	Reverse	printing	issue	withdrawal
		K 10	121 × 80 mm	Puttos		31 March 1900	2 September 1901	28 February 1907
		K 20	131 × 87 mm	female model symbolizing Austria	female model symbolizing Hungary	31 March 1900	20 September 1900	30 June 1910
		K 50	150 × 100 mm	female models		2 January 1902	26 May 1902	31 December 1916
		K 100	160 × 106 mm	Allegories of sciences and industry	Allegories of arts and agriculture	2 January 1902	20 October 1902	31 August 1912
		K 1,000	191 × 127 mm	female model		2 January 1902	2 January 1903	31 December 1918
1904-1910 Series
		K 10	140 × 80 mm	Princess Rohan		2 January 1904	25 February 1905	31 December 1918
		K 20	150 × 89 mm	female model		2 January 1907	22 June 1908	31 December 1915
		K 100	163 × 107 mm	female model		2 January 1910	22 August 1910	31 May 1915
1912-1915 Series
		K 10	150 × 80 mm	boy model		2 January 1915	24 July 1916	31 December 1918
		K 20	150 × 89 mm	female model		2 January 1913	29 September 1913	31 December 1918
		K 50	162 × 100 mm	female model		2 January 1914	18 December 1916	31 December 1918
		K 100	163 × 107 mm	female model		2 January 1912	13 December 1912	31 December 1918
War Series
		K 1		female model	denomination	5 August 1914		
		K 1	112 × 67 mm	classic architecture pattern	Phrygian head	1 December 1916	21 December 1916	31 December 1918
		K 2	112 × 67 mm	female model	denomination	5 August 1914	16 August 1914	31 July 1917
		K 2	125 × 85 mm	female models		1 March 1917	9 July 1917	31 December 1918
		K 5		female model		5 August 1914		
Postwar issues (limited validity)
		K 5		female model	female model	1 October 1918		31 December 1918
		K 25	135 × 80 mm	female model	plain or wavy pattern	27 October 1918	30 October 1918	31 December 1918
		K 200	168 × 100 mm	female model	plain or wavy pattern	27 October 1918	30 October 1918	31 December 1918
		K 10,000	191 × 127 mm	female model	female model	2 November 1918	19 December 1918	31 December 1918
These images are to scale at 0.7 pixel per millimetre (18 pixel per inch). For table standards, see the banknote specification table.
