= Franke Rupert =

Austrian artist

Franke Rupert (In Hungarian literature: Franke Ruppert; 30 October 1888 in Vienna – 1971) was an Austrian graphic designer and engraver. He worked for the Austro-Hungarian Bank until its liquidation, then for the Hungarian Banknote Printing Co., later for the Oesterreichische Nationalbank. He was the engraver of many pengő banknotes and the designer of the low denomination pengő banknote series of 1938. He also designed Schilling banknotes.
