= Lajos Berán =

Hungarian artist

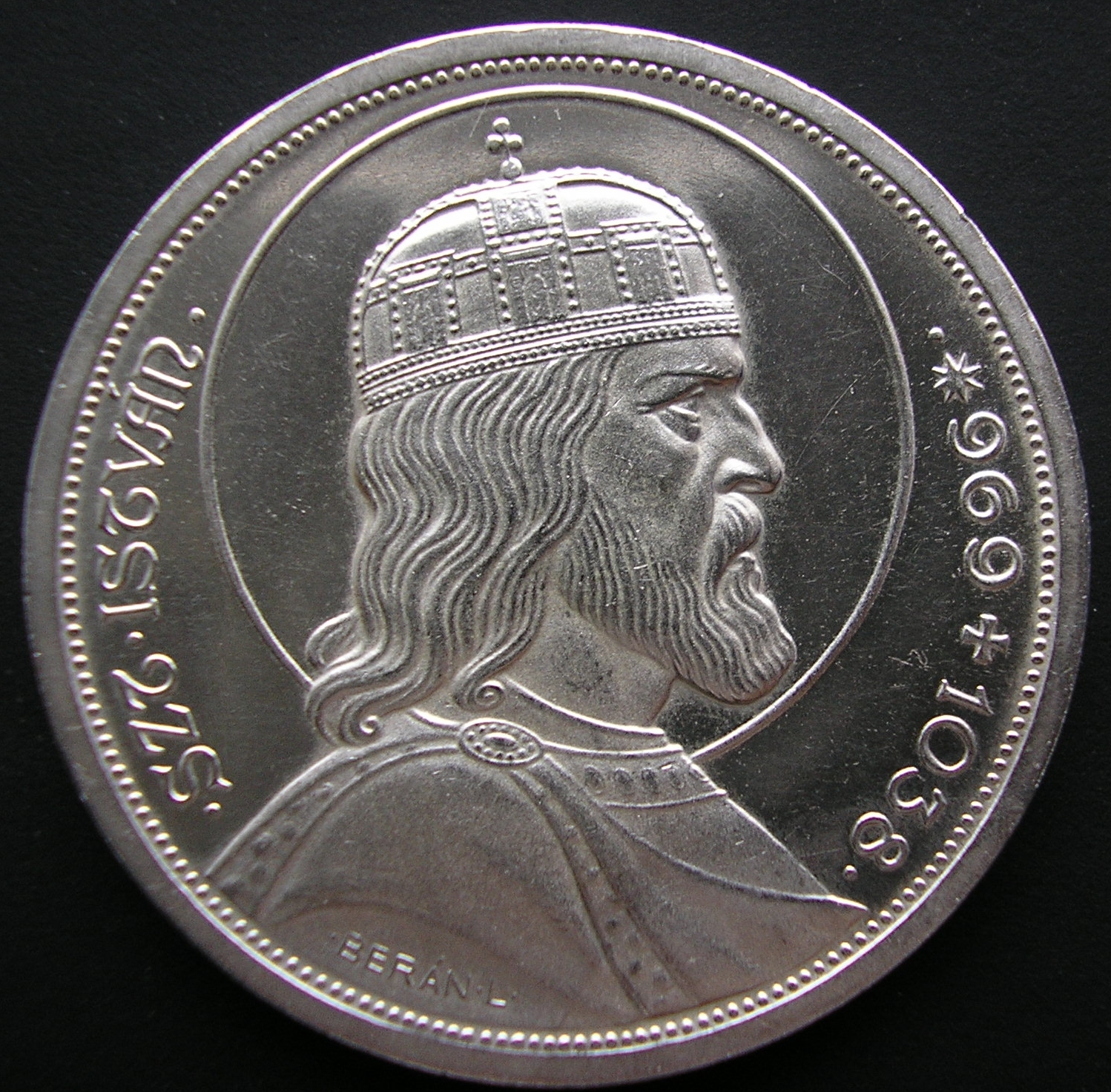
Lajos Berán: Saint Stephen of Hungary on the 5 pengő coin 1938

Lajos Berán (1882 – 1943 in Budapest) was a Hungarian sculptor and artist noted for his medal work.

Notable coins include his 1915 96-mm cast bronze War Medal and 1925 reverse depiction of Ignác Alpár (81mm) and the 1932 Endre Liber reverse, a 72-mm struck bronze. All three are currently on display at the Hungarian National Gallery in Budapest.
