= Géza Mészöly (painter) =

Hungarian painter (1844–1887)

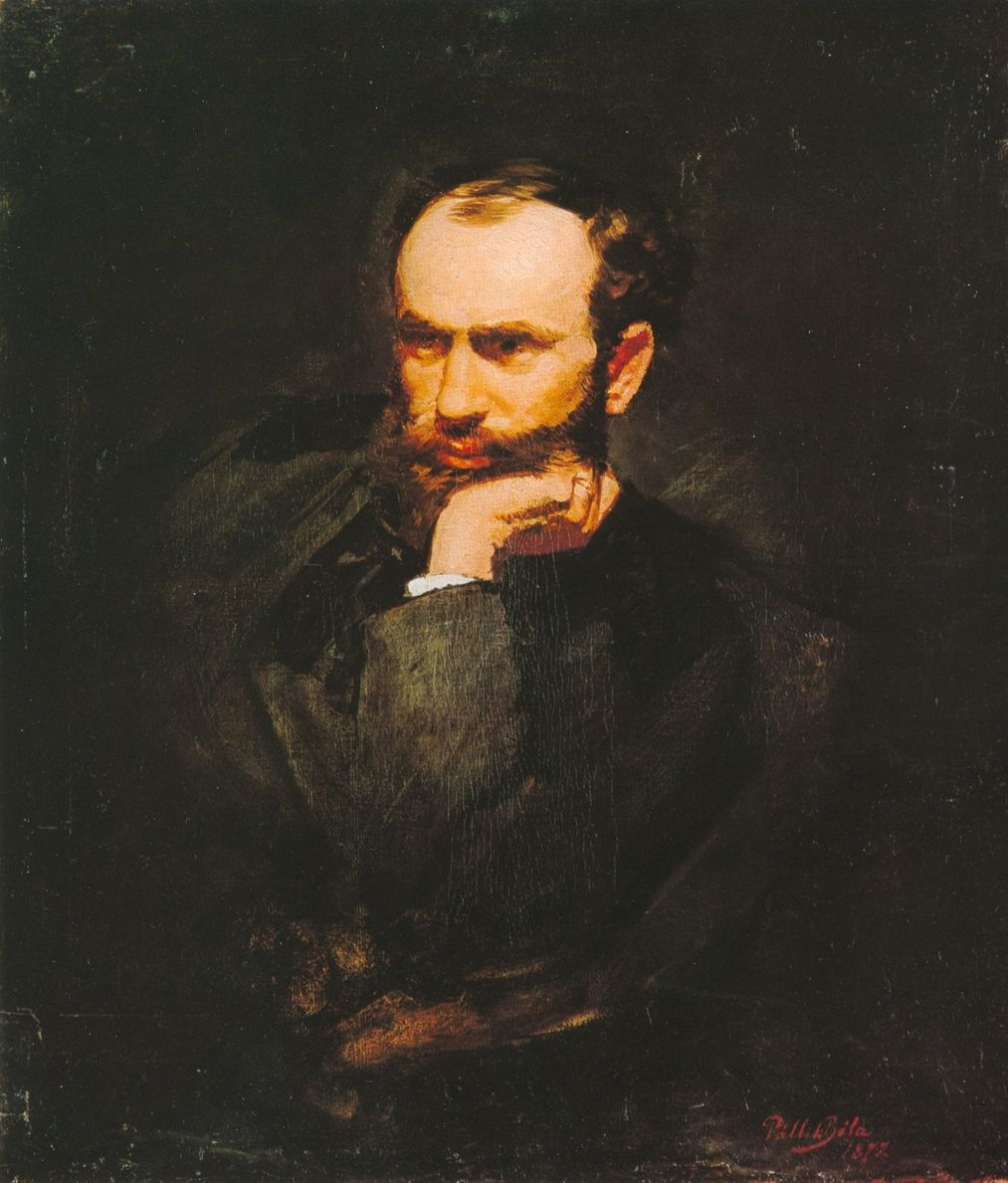
Géza Mészöly (1872); portrait by Béla Pállik.

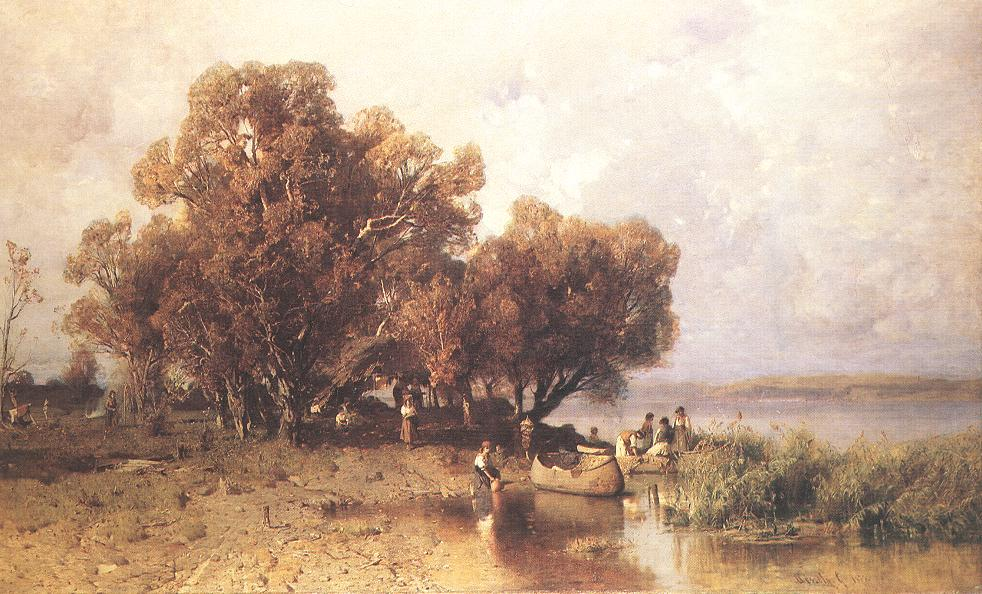
Fisherman's Hut on Lake Balaton (1877); used on the twenty Pengõ banknote, issued in 1926.

Géza Mészöly (18 May 1844 in Sárbogárd – 12 November 1887 in Jobbágyi, Nógrád County) was a Hungarian landscape painter.

== Biography ==
His family was of noble lineage and his father served as a magistrate. After attending the public schools in his hometown and in Hajdúszoboszló, he continued his education at the Calvinist college in Debrecen. During his time in school, he sketched and painted as a pastime, attracting the attention of the art teacher, who encouraged him to follow an artistic career. His parents, however, preferred a legal career and, in 1866, he entered Budapest University with that goal in mind.

In 1867, the painter Antal Ligeti, who was serving as curator of the Hungarian National Museum, noticed Mészöly copying works in the gallery and, impressed by his talent, helped him to enter the Academy of Fine Arts Vienna, where he studied with Robert Russ and Albert Zimmermann. In 1873, the year following his graduation, he opened a studio in Munich. In 1882, he moved to Paris, where he came under the influence of the Barbizon school, and returned to Budapest in 1885.

No sooner had he arrived than he began to have coughing fits and sought relief from them in Venice. He went back to Budapest, apparently much improved, but was virtually bed-ridden by 1887. Once again, he sought relief; this time at a spa in the Hungarian countryside. He died there later that year.

A street was named after him and a monument was erected in Balatonvilágos, an area that featured prominently in his paintings.
