= Bíňa =

Bíňa Bény
- Municipality
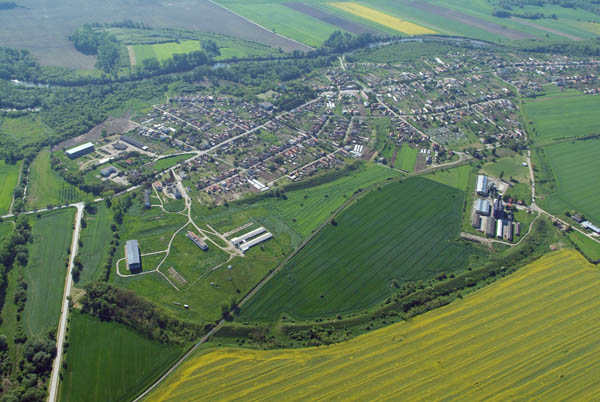

- Flag

- Location of Bíňa in the Nitra Region Location of Bíňa in Slovakia
- Coordinates: 47.92°N 18.65°E
- Country: Slovakia
- Region: Nitra Region
- District: Nové Zámky District
- First mentioned: 1135

Area
  - Total: 23.50 km^{2} (9.07 sq mi)
- Elevation: 130 m (430 ft)

Population (2025)
  - Total: 1,404
- Time zone: UTC+1 (CET)
  - Summer (DST): UTC+2 (CEST)
- Postal code: 943 56
- Area code: +421 36
- Vehicle registration plate (until 2022): NZ
- Website: www.obecbina.sk

Bíňa (Hungarian: Bény) is a municipality and village in the Nové Zámky District in the Nitra Region of south-west Slovakia.

== Geography ==
The municipality lies at an altitude of 130 metres (430 ft) and covers an area of 23.50 km^{2} (9.07 sq mi) (2025).

== History ==
In historical records the village was first mentioned in 1135 written as Byn. Earlier the Romans built a fortress here and in 173 emperor Marcus Aurelius wrote his famous diary in this region during the wars against quadi in the Marcomannic Wars. Later, after the foundation of the Árpád age Hungary, king Stephen I of Hungary gave the region to Bény, son of Hont, the count of the county Hont. During the time of early Christianity every 10 villages was ordered to build a church. Several rotunda have been built in this time, among others the rotunda of Bény, too. In 1217 the Premontre Abbey monastery was founded in Bíňa in the romanesque style. An earlier built rotunda stands before the two tower abbey church. The patrocinium of the rotunda is The 12 Apostles. Such patrocinium of a rotunda was at village Apostag at the Danube. After the Austro-Hungarian army disintegrated in November 1918, Czechoslovak troops occupied the area, later acknowledged internationally by the Treaty of Trianon. Between 1938 and 1945 Bíňa once more became part of Miklós Horthy's Hungary through the First Vienna Award. From 1945 until the Velvet Divorce, it was part of Czechoslovakia. Since then it has been part of Slovakia.

== Population ==
Population statistic (10 years)
Year	1995	2005	2015	2025
Count	1434	1476	1447	1404
Difference		+2.92%	−1.96%	−2.97%

Population statistic
Year	2024	2025
Count	1403	1404
Difference		+0.07%

It has a population of 1404 people (31 December 2025).

=== Ethnicity ===
Census 2021 (1+ %)
Ethnicity	Number	Fraction
Hungarian	1096	76.48%
Slovak	244	17.02%
Not found out	168	11.72%
Romani	20	1.39%
Total	1433	

In year 2021 was 1433 people by ethnicity 1096 as Hungarian, 244 as Slovak, 168 as Not found out, 20 as Romani, 2 as Czech, 2 as German, 1 as Romanian and 1 as Other.

Note on population: The difference values of population numbers in the table "Population statistic" and in the sections "Ethnicity" & "Religion" is caused by the use of various statistical methods.

=== Religion ===
Census 2021 (1+ %)
Religion	Number	Fraction
Roman Catholic Church	1026	71.6%
None	198	13.82%
Not found out	149	10.4%
Calvinist Church	15	1.05%
Greek Catholic Church	15	1.05%
Total	1433	

In year 2021 was 1433 people by religion 1026 from Roman Catholic Church, 198 from None, 149 from Not found out, 15 from Calvinist Church, 15 from Greek Catholic Church, 9 from Christian Congregations in Slovakia, 7 from Jehovah's Witnesses, 7 from Evangelical Church, 4 from Other, 1 from Old Catholic Church, 1 from Other and not ascertained christian church and 1 from Ad hoc movements.

== Facilities ==
The village has a public library and football pitch.

== Gallery ==
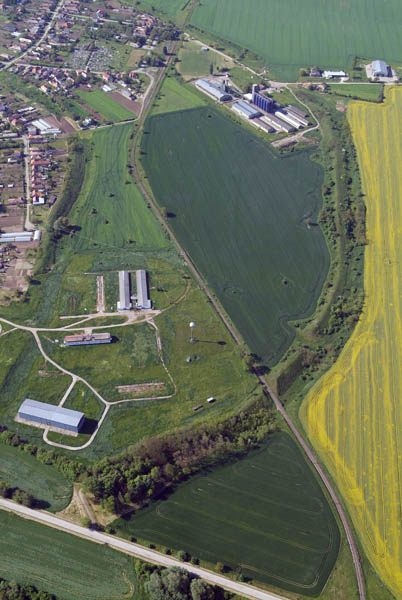

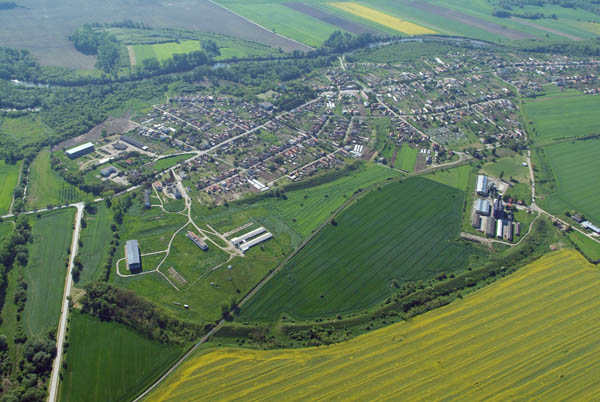

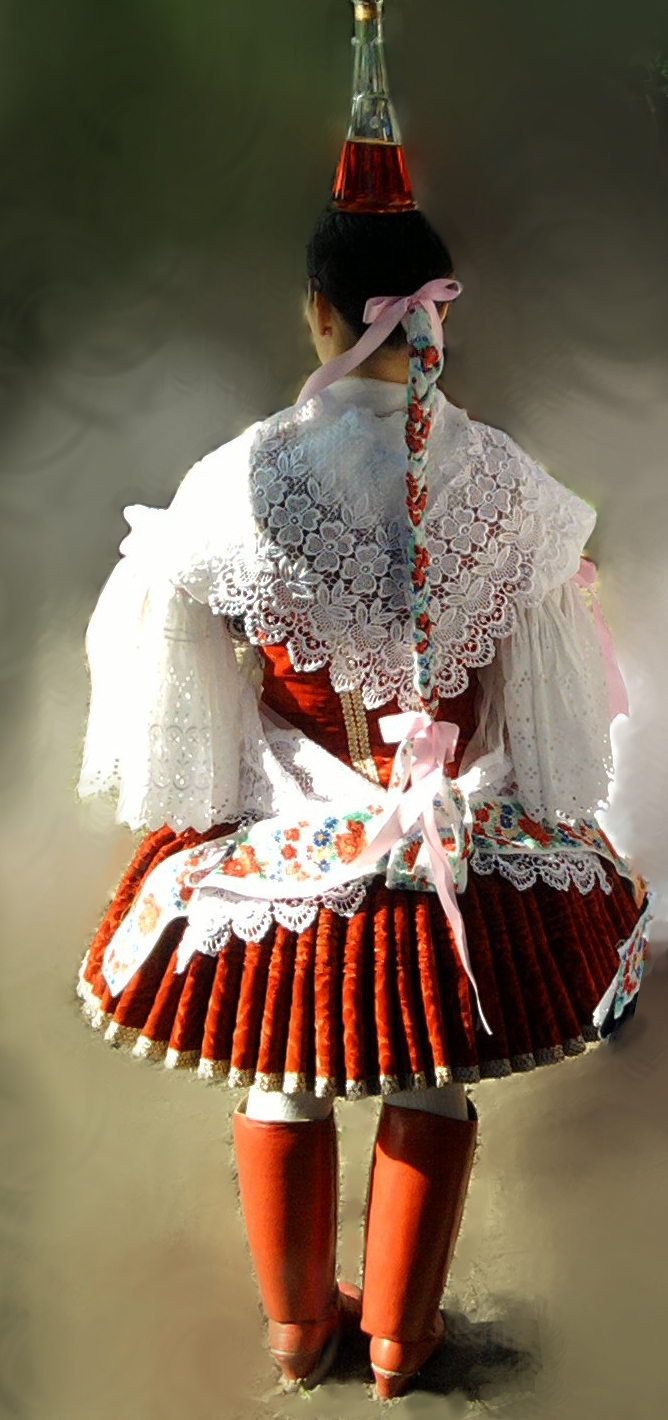

== See also ==
- List of municipalities and towns in Slovakia

== Genealogical resources ==
The records for genealogical research are available at the state archive "Statny Archiv in Nitra, Slovakia"

- Roman Catholic church records (births/marriages/deaths): 1724-1895 (parish B)
- Reformated church records (births/marriages/deaths): 1784-1953 (parish B)
