= Hungarian pengő =

Former currency of Hungary, used 1927–1946

magyar pengő (Hungarian)
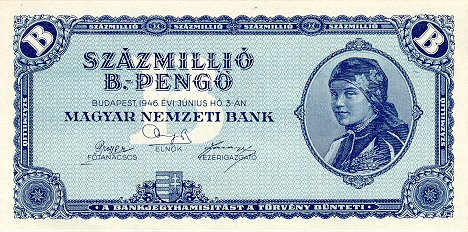
- 100 million trillion (100 quintillion) pengő (1946)

Units of account
- Plural: pengők
- Symbol: P
- Superunit
- 1000000: milpengő
- 1 trillion: b.-pengő
- Subunit
- 1/100: fillér
- Plural
- fillér: fillérek (note: the plural is typically not used about currency)
- Symbol
- fillér: f.

Denominations
- Banknotes
- Freq. used: 50 P, 100 P, 500 P, 1000 P, 10000 P, 100000 P, 1 million-P, 10 million-P, 100 million-P, 1 trillion-P; 10000-mil.‑P, 100000-mil.‑P, 1 million-mil.‑P, 10 million-mil.‑P, 100 million-mil.‑P, 1 trillion-mil.‑P; 10000, 100000, 1 million b.‑P, 10 million b.‑P, 100 million b.‑P
- Rarely used: 1 billion b.‑P (never issued)

Demographics
- Date of introduction: 1 January 1927
- Replaced: Hungarian korona
- Date of withdrawal: 1946
- Replaced by: Hungarian adópengő Hungarian forint
- User(s): Kingdom of Hungary; Republic of Hungary

Issuance
- Central bank: Hungarian National Bank
- Website: www.mnb.hu
- Printer: Hungarian Banknote Printing Corp.
- Website: www.penzjegynyomda.hu
- Mint: Hungarian Mint Ltd.
- Website: www.penzvero.hu

Valuation
- Inflation: 2.9×10^{177}% (annualised rate, July 1946)
- This infobox shows the latest status before this currency was rendered obsolete.

The pengő (Note: Hungarian pronunciation: [ˈpɛŋɡøː]) (sometimes spelled as pengo or pengoe in English) was the currency of Hungary between 1 January 1927, when it replaced the korona, and 31 July 1946, when it was replaced by the forint. The pengő was subdivided into 100 fillér. Although the introduction of the pengő was part of a post-World War I stabilisation program, the currency survived for only 20 years and was rendered worthless by the most extreme hyperinflation ever recorded.

== Name ==
The Hungarian participle pengő means 'ringing' (which in turn derives from the verb peng, an onomatopoeic word equivalent to English 'ring') and was used from the 15th to the 17th century to refer to silver coins making a ringing sound when struck on a hard surface, thus indicating their precious metal content. (The onomatopoeic word used for gold coins is csengő, an equivalent of English 'clinking' meaning a sharper sound; the participle used for copper coins is kongó meaning a deep pealing sound.) After the introduction of paper money of the Austro-Hungarian gulden (Hungarian: forint) in Hungary, the term pengő forint was used to refer to forint coins literally meaning 'ringing forint', figuratively meaning 'silver forint' or 'hard currency'.

At the beginning of the First World War, precious metal coins were recalled from circulation. In the early 1920s, all coins disappeared because of the heavy inflation of the Hungarian korona. The name pengő was probably chosen to suggest stability. However, there was some controversy when choosing the name of the new currency, though the majority agreed that a Hungarian name should be chosen. Proposals included turul (a bird from Hungarian mythology), turán (from the geographical name and ideological term Turan), libertás (the colloquial name of the poltura coins issued by Francis II Rákóczi), and máriás (the colloquial name of coins depicting Mary, patroness of Hungary).

The denomination of the banknotes was indicated in the languages of ethnicities living in the territory of Hungary. The name of the currency was translated as follows: Pengö (pl. Pengö) in German, pengő (pl. pengi) in Slovak, пенгов (pl. пенгова) in Cyrillic script Serbo-Croatian, пенгыв (pl. пенгывов, later пенге) in Rusyn, and pengő (pl. pengei, later penghei) in Romanian. Later pengov (pl. pengova), the Latin script Serbo-Croatian version was also added.

The symbol of the pengő was a capital P placed after the numerals and it was divided into 100 fillér (symbol: f.).

== History ==
=== Introduction of the pengő ===
Interwar pengő
Denominations
- Banknotes: 5 P, 10 P, 20 P, 50 P, 100 P, 1000 P
- Coins
- Freq. used: 1 f., 2 f., 10 f., 20 f., 50 f., 1 P, 2 P, 5 P
- Rarely used: 10 P, 20 P (never issued due to the Great Depression)

Demographics
- Date of introduction: 1 January 1927
- This infobox shows the latest status before this currency was rendered obsolete.

After the First World War, according to article 206 of the Treaty of Saint-Germain, the Austro-Hungarian Bank had to be liquidated and the Austro-Hungarian krone had to be replaced with a different currency, which in the case of Hungary was the Hungarian korona. This currency suffered a high rate of inflation during the early 1920s. A stabilisation program covered by a League of Nations loan helped bring down inflation, and the korona was replaced on 1 January 1927 by a new currency, the pengő, which was introduced by Act XXXV of 1925. It was valued at 12,500 korona, and defined as 3,800 to one kilogram of fine gold – which meant that the pengő was pegged to the gold standard, but was not convertible to gold. In the beginning the cover ratio (which included gold and – up to 50% – foreign exchange) was fixed at 20%, but this had to be raised to 33.3% within five years. This goal was reached quickly: the cover ratio was 51% on 31 July 1930. Later it decreased somewhat due to the economic and financial crisis caused by the Great Depression. Until then the pengő was the most stable currency of the region.

=== World War II ===
WWII pengő
Denominations
- Banknotes: 2 P, 5 P, 10 P, 20 P, 100 P, 1000 P (Note: The 1000 P banknote was, along with 10 P and 100 P notes, only issued as part of the Veszprém series, during which coins were never issued.)
- Coins
- Freq. used: 2 f., 10 f., 20 f., 1 P, 2 P
- Rarely used: 5 P (commemorative only)

Demographics
- Date of introduction: 1939
- This infobox shows the latest status before this currency was rendered obsolete.

Red Army pengő
Denominations
- Banknotes: 1 P, 2 P, 5 P, 10 P, 20 P, 50 P, 100 P, 1000 P

Demographics
- Date of introduction: 1944
- This infobox shows the latest status before this currency was rendered obsolete.

The war caused enormous costs and, later, even higher losses to the relatively small and open Hungarian economy. The national bank was practically under government control, and the issue of money was proportional to budgetary demands. By this time, silver coins disappeared from circulation, and, later, even bronze and cupro-nickel coins were replaced by coins made of cheaper metal. In one of the last acts of World War II, the Szálasi government took control of banknote printing and issued notes without any cover, first in Budapest, then in Veszprém when Budapest had to be evacuated. The occupying Soviet army issued its own military money according to the Hague Conventions.

As a result of the war, the Hungarian economy was destroyed and the government faced large reparation requirements coupled with low revenue. Thus, the Hungarian government chose to use inflation to its advantage in order to restore production and the economy as well as essentially a form of tax to generate revenue.

=== Hyperinflation ===
The pengő lost value dramatically after World War II, suffering the highest rate of hyperinflation ever recorded in human history. This far exceeded the hyperinflation that affected the German mark in 1923. There were several attempts to slow it down, such as a 75% capital levy in December 1945. However, this did not stop the hyperinflation, and prices continued spiraling out of control, with ever-higher denominations introduced. The denominations milpengő (one million pengő) and bilpengő (short: b.-pengő, one trillion (1000000000000) P) were used to simplify calculations, cut down the number of zeros and enable the reuse of banknote designs with only the colour and denomination name changed.

The hyperinflation was so out of control that at one stage it took only about 15 hours for prices to double and about four days for the pengő to lose 90% of its prior value.

==== Adópengő ====
The Hungarian government introduced the adópengő (lit. 'tax pengő') on 1 January 1946, originally as an indexed unit of account for budget planning: the idea was that by setting the value of the adópengő in terms of regular pengős every day, the adópengő would try to protect the government budget from the effects of hyperinflation. The value of the adópengő in terms of regular pengős started at par, but the rate declined to 630 pengős by 1 May 1946, and then two sextillion pengős (2×10^{21} = 1,000 billion billion) by 31 July the same year.

On 29 May 1946, Ferenc Gordon (then Minister of Finance) started issuing adópengő tax bills, and on 9 July the same year, the tax bills became legal tender. According to William Bomberger and Gail Makinen, the issuance of the tax bills escalated the hyperinflation that eventually affected both regular pengős and adópengős — but the adópengő nevertheless forced the regular pengő into disuse as prices expressed in the latter became unbearable.

=== End of the pengő ===
On 11 July 1946, the Hungarian National Bank released the last pengő banknotes, for 100 million B-pengős (10^{20} = 100 quintillion); the Bank also printed banknotes for one billion B-pengős (10^{21} = one sextillion), but they never entered circulation. The last adópengő banknote, for 100000000 adópengős, followed on 25 July, and was equal to 200 octillion pengős (2×10^{29} = 200 billion billion billion) on 31 July.

Ultimately, only a new currency could stabilize the country's financial situation. On 1 August 1946, Hungary reintroduced the forint at a ratio of 400 octillion pengős to 1 (4×10^{29} = 400 billion billion billion), dropping 29 zeroes from the old currency, or 200000000 adópengős to 1.

According to Bomberger and Makinen, the circulation of regular pengő notes peaked at around 76 septillion pengős (7.6×10^{25} = 76 million billion billion) on 15 July 1946. The conversion rate therefore reduced the peak value of all circulating pengő notes to 0.019 fillér (19/100000 forint), allowing the Hungarian National Bank to start over without having to redeem regular pengő notes. By contrast, the largest tax bill in circulation (100000000 adópengős) was worth 50 fillérs each, and remained in circulation for a short time after the reform.

The reform also attempted to reduce the risk of hyperinflation on the forint, by setting the exchange rate for gold at 13.21 forints per gram: however, no means of conversion to forints at that rate were recorded to be in use at that time.

== Coins ==
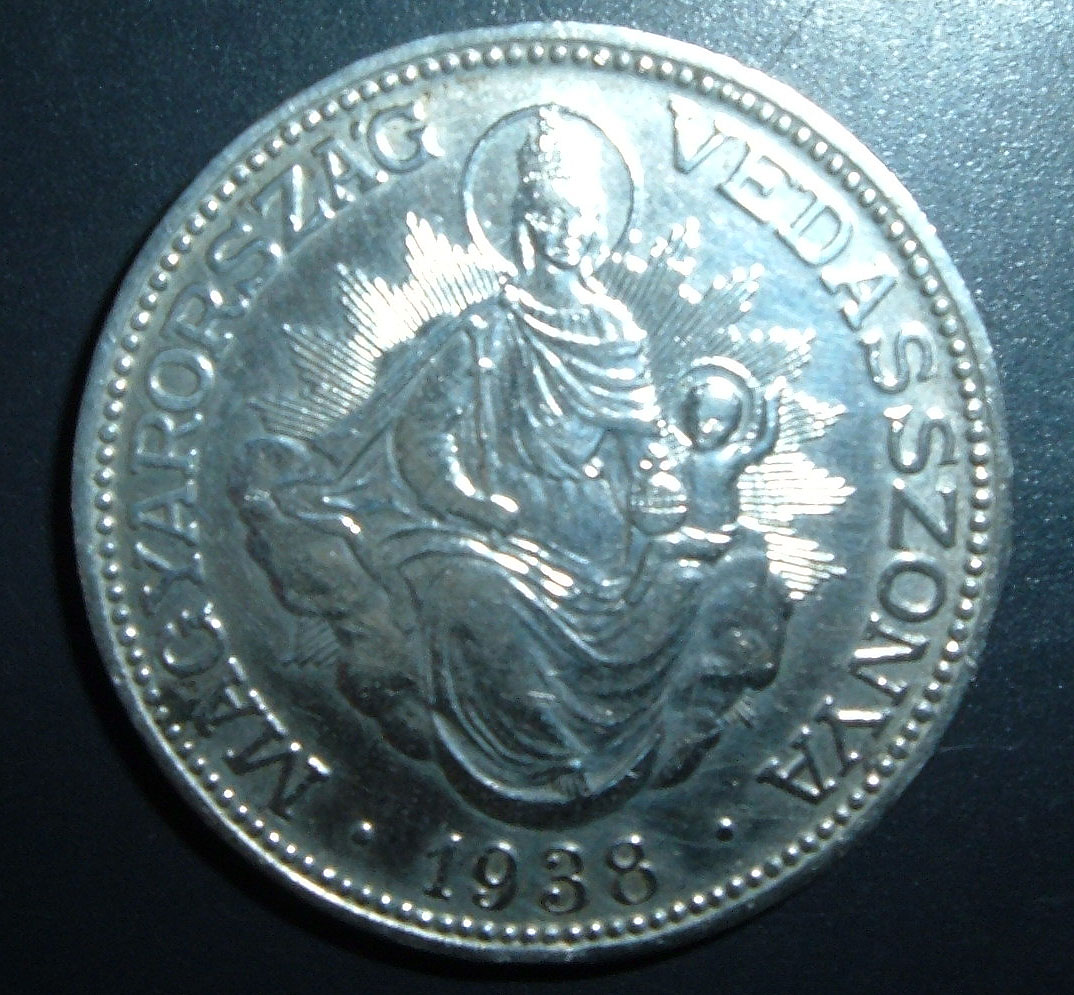
2 pengő, 1936

In 1926, coins of 1, 2, 10, 20 and 50 fillér and 1 P were introduced. The 1f and 2f pieces were bronze, the 10f, 20f and 50f were cupro-nickel and the 1 P coins were 64% silver. In 1929, 2 P coins were introduced, also in 64% silver. Commemorative 2 P and 5 P coins were also issued on anniversaries, with a non-commemorative 5 P coin issued in 1939.

During the Second World War, the 1 f. coin ceased production, the 2 f. coins were issued in steel and then zinc, the 10 f. and 20 f. coins were minted in steel and the 1 P, 2 P and 5 P pieces were struck in aluminium.

In 1945, the provisional government introduced new aluminium 5 P coins, the last issued before the hyperinflation.

== Paper money ==
The Hungarian National Bank issued the first series of 5 P, 10 P, 20 P, 50 P, 100 P banknotes in the final days of 1926. These were offset prints on watermarked paper (except for the 5 P note). The banknotes featured notable Hungarian people on the obverse and either different locations in Budapest or paintings on the reverse, thus also serving an educational purpose.

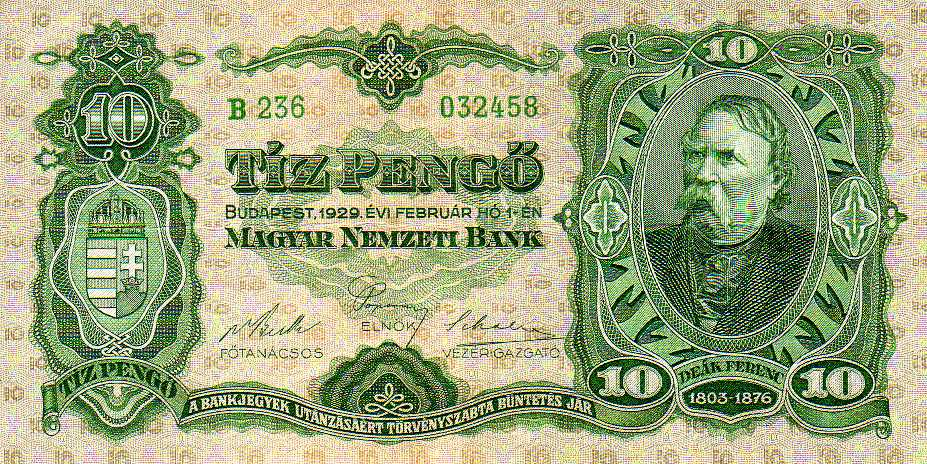
10 P, 1929

A new series of banknotes soon had to be printed to meet higher security standards. The engravings were executed and designed by Endre Horváth, a Hungarian graphic artist. New 5 P, 10 P, 20 P, 50 P and 100 P pengő notes were printed and a 1000 P banknote was added to this series — however, the latter had such a high value that it was rarely used except for large cash transactions between businesses and banks. This new series had almost the same features as the previous ones. 5 P notes were soon replaced with silver coins.

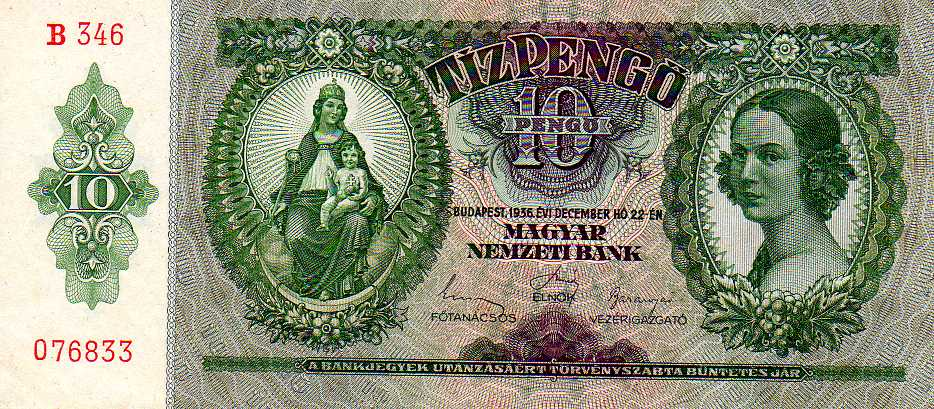
10 P, 1936

After the Vienna Award, Hungary had to supply its recovered territories with money. Since increasing the amount of silver coins would have been too expensive, 1 P and 5 P notes were issued in 1941 and 1938, respectively. These notes were of simple design and poor quality. Meanwhile, a series of new banknotes including 2 P, 5 P, 10 P and 20 P denominations was issued. The designs represented ornaments based on Hungarian folk art and people.

At the end of the Second World War, the Szálasi government and the occupying Soviet army issued provisional notes in the territories under their power, exacerbating inflation.

As late as 1945, the reverse side of banknotes included the denomination spelled out six times in words, in five non-Hungarian languages representing territories that Hungary had lost after World War One: Romanian (Transylvania, eastern Banat), Slovak (Slovakia), Serbian (Vojvodina) in the Latin and Cyrillic scripts, Rusyn (Transcarpathia) and German (Burgenland).

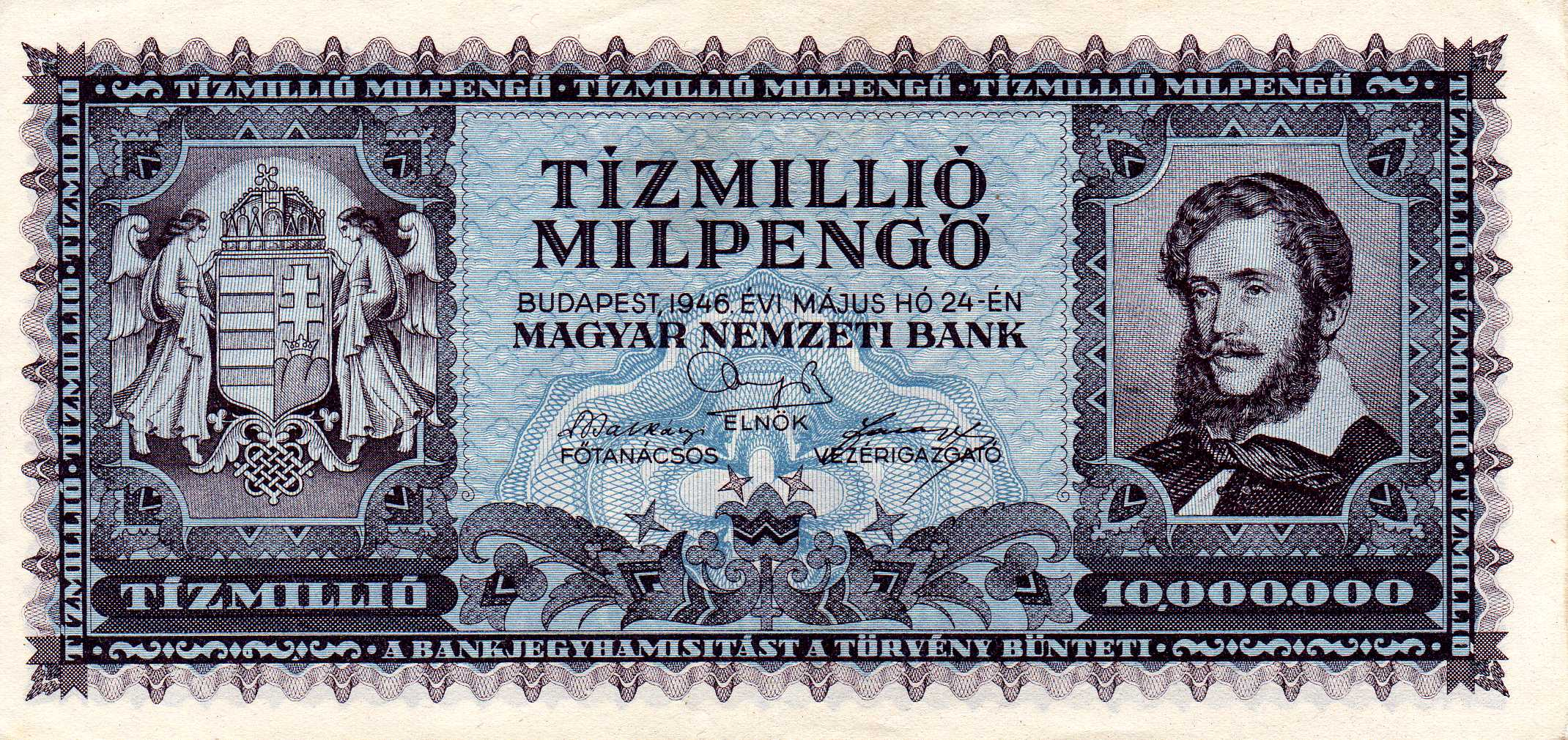
10 million mil.-P, 1946

In 1945 and 1946, hyperinflation caused the issuance of notes up to 100 million b.-P (100 quintillion or 10^{20} P). During the period of hyperinflation, note designs were reused, changing the colour and replacing the word pengő first with milpengő, then b.-pengő, to generate higher denominations. The largest denomination produced was 100 million b.-P (100 quintillion or 10^{20} P). The note was initially worth about US$0.20. Notes of one milliard b.-P (one sextillion or 10^{21} P) were printed but never issued.

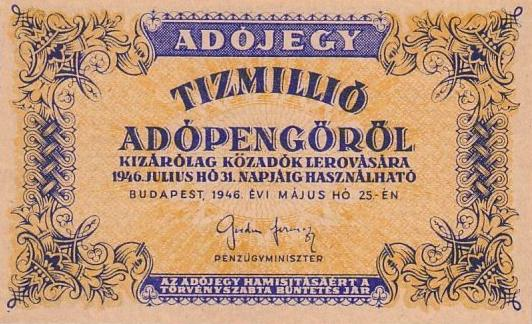
10 million adópengő, 1946

The introduction of adópengő was an attempt to limit inflation. It slowed inflation somewhat, but did not stop the depreciation of the currency. Bonds were issued by the Ministry of Finance in denominations between 10000 and 100000000 adópengő. These simple design notes on low-quality paper became legal currency in the last months of the hyperinflation, almost completely replacing the pengő.

The enormous amount of paper consumed during the production of adópengő notes caused a shortage of good quality security paper, which hindered the production of forint banknotes.

== Historical exchange rates ==
Exchange rates (US$1 in pengő)
Date	Pengő
1 January 1927	5 P. 26 f.
31 December 1937	5 P. 40 f.
31 March 1941	5 P. 06 f.
30 June 1944	33 P. 51 f.
31 August 1945	1320 P
31 October 1945	8200 P
30 November 1945	108000 P
31 December 1945	128000 P
31 January 1946	795000 P
31 March 1946	1750000 P
30 April 1946	59000000000 P (5.9×10^{10} P)
31 May 1946	42000000000000000 P (4.2×10^{16} P)
10 July 1946	4600000000000000000000000000000 P (4.6×10^{30} P)

Black market exchange rates (US$1 in pengő)
Date	Pengő	Scientific notation	Spelled out
1 July 1945	1320 P	1.32×10^{3}	
August 1945	1510 P	1.51×10^{3}	
1 September 1945	5400 P	5.4×10^{3}	
October 1945	23500 P	2.35×10^{4}	
1 November 1945	108000 P	1.08×10^{5}	
December 1945	290000 P	2.9×10^{5}	
January 1946	795000 P	7.95×10^{5}	
February 1946	2850000 P	2.85×10^{6}	
March 1946	17750000 P	1.775×10^{7}	
April 1946	232000000 P	2.32×10^{8}	232 million
May 1946	59000000000 P	5.9×10^{10}	59 billion
First two weeks of June 1946	7600000000000 P	7.6×10^{12}	7.6 trillion
Second two weeks of June 1946	42000000000000000 P	4.2×10^{16}	42 quadrillion
First week of July 1946	22000000000000000000 P	2.2×10^{19}	22 quintillion
Second week of July 1946	481500000000000000000000 P	4.815×10^{23}	481.5 sextillion
Third week of July 1946	5800000000000000000000000 P	5.8×10^{24}	5.8 septillion
Fourth week of July 1946	4600000000000000000000000000000 P	4.6×10^{30}	4.6 nonillion

Exchange rates (1 adópengő in pengő)
Date	Pengő
1 January 1946	1 P
1 February 1946	1 P. 70 f.
1 March 1946	10 P
1 April 1946	44 P
1 May 1946	630 P
1 June 1946	160000 P
1 July 1946	7500000000 P (7.5×10^{9} P)
10 July 1946	2000000000000000000000 P (2×10^{21} P)

== See also ==
- Zimbabwean dollar
- Brazilian cruzado
- Venezuelan bolívar
- Hungarian National Bank
- Hyperinflation
- Great Depression
- Names of large numbers
- Long and short scales

Pengő
Preceded by: Hungarian korona Reason: inflation Ratio: 1 pengő = 12,500 korona	Currency of Hungary; 1 January 1927 – 31 July 1946; Concurrent with: adópengő since 1 January 1946; Note: korona notes overstamped to pengő in 1926 were not legally considered pengő	Succeeded by: Hungarian forint Reason: Hyperinflation; Ratio: 1 forint = 4×10^{29} pengő Note: notes were denominated in milpengő and b.-pengő for practical reasons
Preceded by: Yugoslav 1920 dinar Reason: Hungarian occupation	Currency of Bačka, Međimurje (as part of Hungary); 1941 – 1945	Succeeded by: Yugoslav 1945 dinar Reason: reunification of Yugoslavia as a result of World War II and end of Hungarian occupation
Preceded by: Czechoslovak koruna Reason: First Vienna Award	Currency of southern Slovakia (as part of Hungary); 1938 – 1945	Succeeded by: Czechoslovak koruna Reason: reunification of Czechoslovakia as a result of World War II and end of Hungarian occupation
Preceded by: Czechoslovak koruna Reason: First Vienna Award	Currency of Governorate of Subcarpathia (as part of Hungary); 1938 – 1945	Succeeded by: Soviet ruble Reason: became part of Ukraine SSR, Soviet Union as a result of World War II and end of Hungarian occupation
Preceded by: Romanian leu Reason: Second Vienna Award	Currency of Northern Transylvania (as part of Hungary); 1940 – 1944	Succeeded by: Romanian leu Reason: returned to Romania as a result of World War II and end of Hungarian occupation
