= Capital levy =

Type of tax

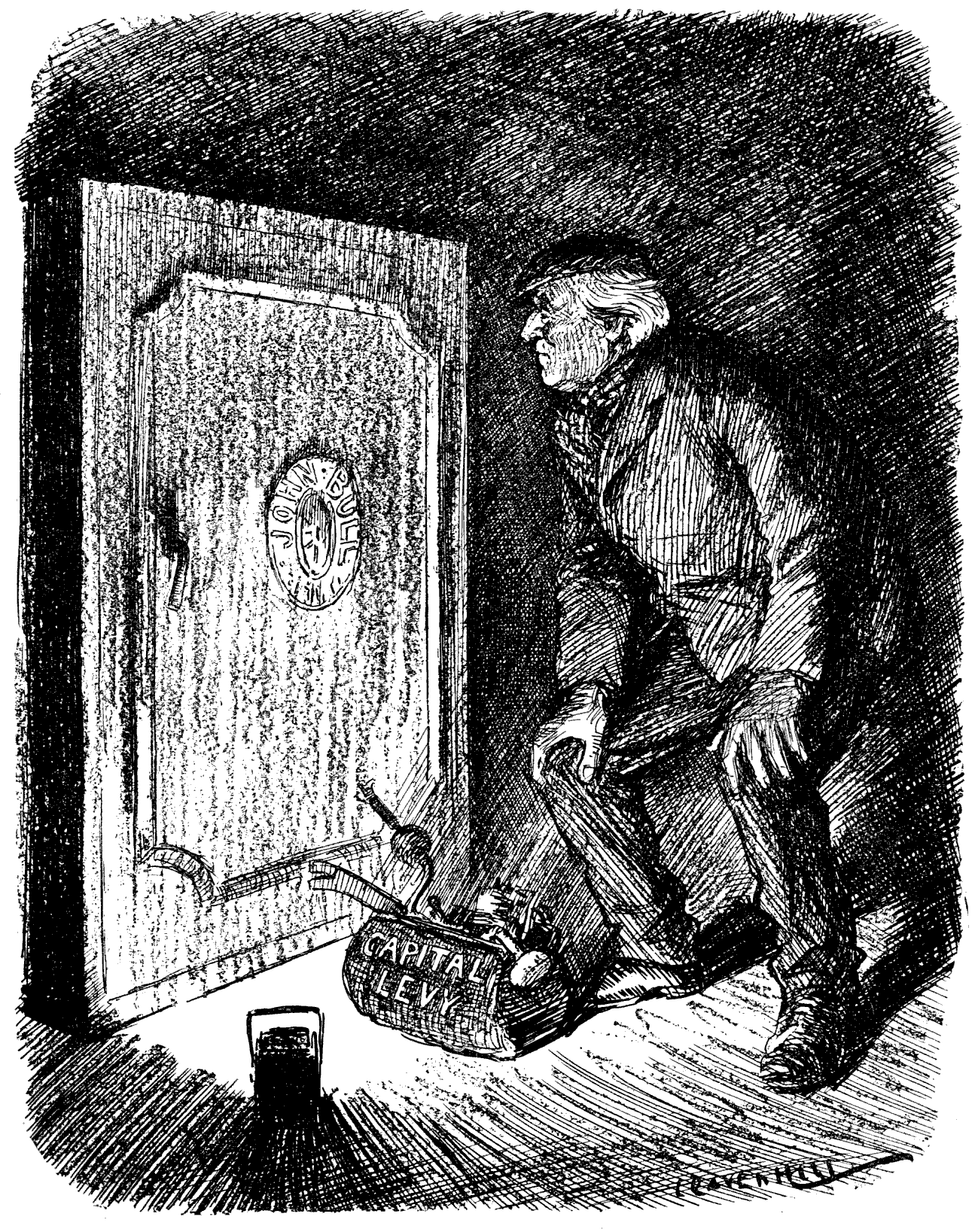
The Conscientious Burglar. Paisley humanitarian. "If I could only be quite sure that I shouldn't be discouraging him from saving." "Mr. Asquith has pronounced himself cautiously in favour of a capital levy, on the condition, amongst others, that it must not be allowed to discourage the habit of saving." Cartoon from Punch magazine (February 11, 1920), illustrating part of the dilemma for governments pondering the use of a capital levy.

A capital levy is a tax on capital rather than income, collected once, rather than repeatedly (regular collection would make it a wealth tax). For example, a capital levy of 30% will see an individual or business with a net worth of $100,000 pay a one-off sum of $30,000, regardless of income. Capital levies are considered difficult for a government to implement.

Some economists argue that capital levies are a disincentive to savings and investment, and cause capital flight, but others argue that in theory this need not be the case. The latter view was popular in the World Wars; in the 2010s, it has also gained some acceptance as more heavily indebted nations struggle to raise revenues.

== Examples of capital levies ==
=== Ancient democracies ===
In ancient Athens during its democracy, there was a form of capital levy known as a liturgy (Ancient Greek: λειτουργία, romanized: leitourgia, lit. '"work for the people"; from litos ergos, "public service"'). The liturgy might be anything from financing a public play to supplying and manning a trireme for the navy. An Athenian could volunteer for such a levy, but if no-one volunteered, a wealthy person meeting the eligibility requirements would be ordered to supply it. They could escape by nominating someone wealthier to take over the duty; if the nominated person disputed this, the nominator could take the liturgy, or offer to exchange property with their nominee (antidosis). If the nominee refused, the matter went to court, and the liturgy was assigned whoever the court case determined to be wealthier. Athenians often concealed their wealth to escape taxation, and sycophants who discovered concealed wealth might use it as blackmail material. Antidosis helped the state identify the wealthiest people, and kept the rich suspicious of one another. Athens also had a wealth tax called eisphora (see symmoria), and for this purpose the city required each rich person give an estimate of his fortune (τίμημα). These self-assessments were not very accurate. The liturgy has not been much studied by economists.

=== 20th century ===
During both World Wars, capital levies were introduced, with the generally-stated aim of distributing the sacrifices required by the war more evenly. This had a significant effect on both income and wealth distributions, lasting decades into the post-war period. Such policies were commonly referred to as the "conscription of wealth".

a fundamental objection to the government's policy of conscription is that it conscripts human life only, and that it does not attempt to conscript wealth...

— Liberal party election platform, autumn 1917, Canada

The Economist, a British publication, opposed capital levies, but supported "direct taxation heavy enough to amount to rationing of citizens' incomes"; similarly, the American economist Oliver Mitchell Wentworth Sprague, in the Economic Journal, argued that "conscription of men should logically and equitably be accompanied by something in the nature of conscription of current income above that which is absolutely necessary".

=== 21st century ===
The Italian government of Giuliano Amato imposed a 0.6 percent levy on all bank deposits on 11 July 1992.

In 1999, Donald Trump proposed for the United States a one-off 14.25% levy on the net worth of individuals and trusts worth $10 million or more. Trump claimed that this would generate $5.7 trillion in new taxes, which could be used to eliminate the national debt.

The Cypriot government levied 47.5 percent of Bank of Cyprus deposits over one hundred thousand Euros in July 2013. In October 2013, the International Monetary Fund released a report stating, "The sharp deterioration of the public finances in many countries has revived interest in a 'capital levy' – a one-off tax on private wealth – as an exceptional measure to restore debt sustainability. The appeal is that such a tax, if it is implemented before avoidance is possible and there is a belief that it will never be repeated, does not distort behavior." The next year the Bundesbank proposed that Eurozone countries should attempt a one-off levy of bank deposits to avoid bankruptcy.

A February 2014 report by Reuters showed the idea had gained traction in the European Commission, which will ask its insurance watchdog later that year for advice on a possible draft law "to mobilize more personal pension savings for long-term financing".

In the United Kingdom, a report published by the Wealth Tax Commission in December 2020 recommended the introduction of a one-off wealth tax in case the government chooses to raise taxes in order to address the challenges for public finances posed by the COVID-19 recession. Without taking a stance on specific exemption thresholds or tax rates, the estimations presented in the report imply that a well-designed 5% one-off tax on individual net wealth above £500,000 could raise as much as £260 billion. The recommendations set out in the report were subsequently discussed in the Treasury Select Committee. The chair of the committee, Mel Stride, suggested that the proposal of a one-off wealth tax is “probably nearer the end of the spectrum of the possible-stroke-question mark-desirable than an annual wealth tax.”

== See also ==
- Bank levy
- Wealth tax
