= Hungarian korona =

Former currency of Hungary

magyar korona (in Hungarian) coroană ungară (in Romanian) ungarische Krone (in German) maďarská koruna (in Slovak) мађарска круна (in Serbian) мадярска коруна (in Rusyn)
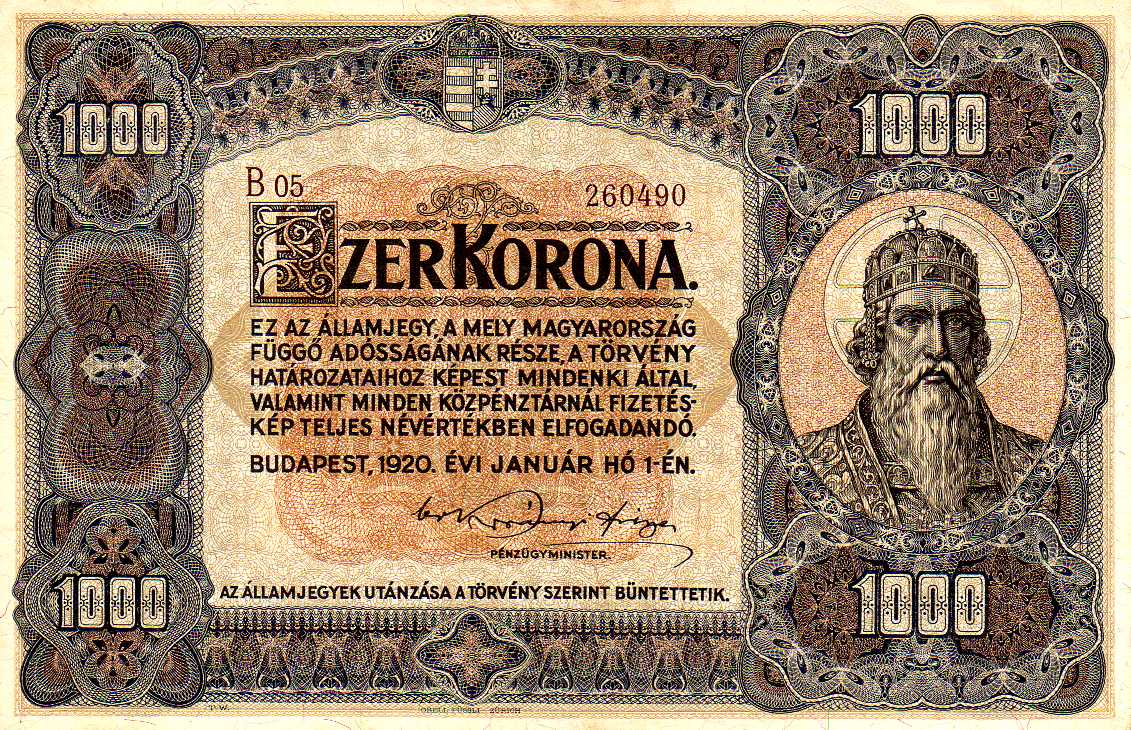
1000 korona (obverse)
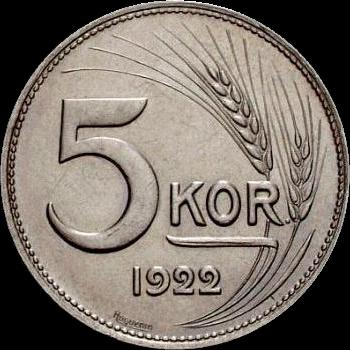
5 korona trial strike (reverse)

Unit
- Symbol: K, kr

Denominations
- Subunit
- 1/100: fillér
- Banknotes: 20, 50 fillér, 1, 2, 10, 20, 25, 50, 100, 200, 500, 1,000, 5,000, 10,000, 25,000, 50,000, 100,000, 500,000, 1,000,000 korona
- Coins: 10, 20 fillér

Demographics
- Replaced by: Hungarian pengő
- User(s): Hungarian People's Republic; Hungarian Soviet Republic; Hungarian Republic; Kingdom of Hungary

Issuance
- Central bank: Hungarian Royal State Note Issuing Institute
- Printer: Orell Füssli (Zürich); Hungarian Banknote Printing Corp. (Budapest)
- Mint: Hungarian Mint Ltd.
- This infobox shows the latest status before this currency was rendered obsolete.

The Hungarian korona (Hungarian: magyar korona; korona in English is "crown") was the replacement currency of the Austro-Hungarian Krone/korona amongst the boundaries of the newly created post-World War I Hungary. It suffered a serious inflation and was replaced by the pengő on 1 January 1927.

== Introduction ==
According to the Treaty of Trianon and other treaties regulating the situation of countries emerging from the ruins of the dissolved Austro-Hungarian Empire, the former banknotes had to be overstamped by the new states and — after a given transition-period — replaced by a new currency. In the case of Hungary, this currency was the korona, which replaced its Austro-Hungarian counterpart at par. Hungary was the last country to fulfil the replacement obligation of the treaties and the stamps used for overstamping were very easy to copy, so a large portion of the common currency circulated in Hungary was fake. This was a factor contributing to the process which finally led to a serious inflation. Finally, in 1927, the korona was replaced by the pengő at a rate of 12,500 korona = 1 pengő.

== Coins ==
Körmöcbánya (today: Kremnica, Slovakia), the site of the only mint of Hungary (since the Gyulafehérvár mint in Transylvania (today: Alba Iulia, Romania) was closed in 1871) was awarded to the newly created Czechoslovakia according to the Treaty of Trianon. Thus, the mint machinery was moved to Budapest and set up at different places until the Hungarian State Mint was created.

Only 10 and 20 fillér coins were minted as part of the korona system: first in 1919 under the Soviet Republic with the original Körmöcbánya coin dies (1916 and 1918 restrikes); then in 1920 and 1921 with the correct years of minting but still using the same design and the K.B. Körmöcbánya mintmark.

== Paper money ==
The first paper money printed in Hungary were 1, 2, 25 and 200 korona banknotes — similar to those issued in Vienna during the end of the war. However, the use of these banknotes was limited to Austria and Hungary, and later even Austria considered the Hungarian issues to be counterfeits. Later, as there was no national bank in Hungary, the Postal Savings Bank received the right to print bills denominated 5, 10 and 20 korona. The overstamping of the banknotes of the Austro-Hungarian Bank started only in 1920 — the last of all states emerging from the ruins of the former Monarchy. Finally, the Hungarian Royal State Note Institute was founded and granted the right to issue treasury notes.
