= AP =

AP, Ap, A&P, or A/P may refer to:

== People ==
- AP (rapper) (Yohann Duport, born 1979), French rapper
- Adrian Peterson, former American football running back
- Arthur Paul Harper (1865–1955), New Zealand lawyer, mountaineer, explorer, businessman, known as AP
- ap ('son of'), part of a Welsh patronymic
- a/p ('daughter of'), in Malaysian Indian names

== Arts, entertainment, media, and academia ==
- Artist's proof, indicated as A/P or AP
- Absolute pitch, the ability to identify a musical note without a reference tone
- "AP" (song), by Pop Smoke, 2021
- See also: Argyle Park, a band reformed under the name AP2
- "A&P" (short story), by John Updike, 1961
- AP, a character in animated TV series Atomic Puppet

=== Gaming, literature, and education ===
- Action point, a video game term
- Palatine Anthology, or Anthologia Palatina, a collection of Ancient Greek poems
- Advanced Placement, North American program offering college-level courses at schools

=== Media ===
- Academic Press, an American academic publisher
- Alternative Press (magazine), an American entertainment magazine
- Amalgamated Press, a former British newspaper and magazine publishing company
- Amiga Power, a defunct video games magazine
- Ang Pamantasan, a Philippine student publication
- Associated Press, an American news agency

== Places and transportation ==
- Amapá, Brazil, ISO code BR-AP
- Andhra Pradesh, India, ISO code IN-AP
- Province of Ascoli Piceno, Italy, vehicle registration code
- Automotive Products, a former British company
- Atlantic and Pacific Railroad, in the United States
- Austin & Pickersgill, a British shipbuilding company
- A&P Group, a British ship repair company

=== Aviation ===
- Pakistan (aircraft registration prefix AP)
- Air One, an Italian airline, IATA code AP
- Polish Aero Club (Polish: Aeroklub Polski)
- A&P mechanic, an aircraft maintenance technician with airframe and powerplant ratings

== Science and technology ==
=== Computing and networks ===
- AP, an alternative characterization of PSPACE In computational complexity theory
- Application Processor, usually means CPU
- Wireless access point, or access point, a networking hardware device
- Address plus Port (A+P), a technique for sharing IPv4 addresses
- ActivityPub, a social networking protocol

=== Medicine, biology, and chemistry ===
- Attachment parenting, a parenting philosophy
- Colporrhaphy or A&P repair, of vaginal walls
- Anatomy and physiology, the study of the structure and function, respectively, of living organisms; frequently discussed as a pair
- Acute pancreatitis, a sudden inflammation of the pancreas
- Area postrema, a part of the brain
- AP site, a location in DNA or RNA
- Aminopurine, common name for two different compounds
- Ammonium perchlorate, an inorganic compound

=== Other uses in science and technology ===
- Aerial photograph
- Ap and Bp stars
- Armour-piercing ammunition
- AboitizPower, a Philippine energy holding company
- Audemars Piguet, Swiss watchmaker

== Language and politics ==
- Adjective phrase, a phrase whose head is an adjective
- Ap (water), a Vedic Sanskrit term
- ap, a classical abbreviation for ad pedes or aedilitia potestate

=== Political parties ===
- Acción Popular (disambiguation), the name of several parties
- Alaskan Party
- Justice Party (Turkey) (Turkish: Adalet Partisi)
  - Justice Party (Turkey, 2015)
- People's Action (Romania) (Romanian: Acțiunea Populară)
- People's Alliance (Spain) (Spanish: Alianza Popular)
- Labour Party (Norway) (Norwegian: Arbeiderpartiet)

== Farming, food, and drink ==
- Agricultural and Pastoral Shows, in New Zealand
- All Purpose, a common grade of wheat flour
- A&P, the Great Atlantic & Pacific Tea Company, a former American chain of grocery stores
  - A&P Canada, former supermarket chain
  - Great Atlantic & Pacific Tea Company (disambiguation)

== Money ==
- Accounts payable, in accounting
- Hungarian adópengő, a former currency, symbol AP
- Atlantic Philanthropies, a private foundation

== Other uses ==
- AP, a classification symbol for an auxiliary of the United States Navy
- Armenian Power, an Armenian criminal gang in Los Angeles, U.S.
- Dutch Data Protection Authority (Dutch: Autoriteit Persoonsgegevens)

== See also ==
- AAP (disambiguation)
- APP (disambiguation)
- APS (disambiguation)
