= Great Atlantic & Pacific Tea Company (disambiguation) =

Great Atlantic & Pacific Tea Company, better known as A&P, was an American chain of grocery stores.

Great Atlantic & Pacific Tea Company may also refer to:

- Great Atlantic & Pacific Tea Company (Atlanta, Georgia), an historic building on the National Register of Historic Places listings in Fulton County, Georgia, U.S.
- Great Atlantic and Pacific Tea Company Warehouse (Jersey City, New Jersey), an historic building
- Great Atlantic and Pacific Tea Company Warehouse (Buffalo, New York), an historic building
- A&P Warehouse, formerly Great Atlantic and Pacific Tea Company Warehouse, an historic building in Tribeca, Manhattan, New York City

== See also ==
- AP (disambiguation), including A&P
