= Paper money of the Hungarian adópengő =

The adópengő bonds and certificates served as money in the last days before the introduction of the Hungarian forint.

== Tax bills ==
Adópengő (tax-pengő) was introduced on 1 January 1946. The aim was to create a numerical basis for budget calculations, which was independent from the daily changes. The index was created daily by the Institute for Economic Research (then: Magyar Gazdaságkutató Intézet, now: GKI Gazdaságkutató Zrt.) based on retail prices (weights: food and other agricultural products: 50%, industrial products (market price): 30%, and industrial products (fixed price): 20%). The so-called adójegy (tax bill - a bond for adópengő with two months maturity) was introduced in May 1946. First, tax bills were used to pay taxes and to register bank deposits and bank credits. From 23 June it was also used to pay public utility charges and from 8 July it became a legal tender, replacing the pengő, which almost totally lost its value by this time. When the tax-bills became legal tender, the even more serious adópengő inflation replaced the pengő inflation. The adópengő was eventually replaced by the forint at a ratio of 200 million adópengő to one forint.

The Ludas Matyi satirical magazine explains aptly the relationship between the pengő and the adópengő: "The pengő was the piece of paper that had no value, and the adópengő was used to measure the value of the pengő."

The Tax bills were designed by Endre Horváth.

Tax bills
Image		Value	Dimensions	Description		Date of			
Obverse	Reverse	Value	Dimensions	Obverse	Reverse	printing	issue	withdrawal	lapse
		10,000 adópengő	136 × 83 mm	Value	Application clause	28 May 1946	13 June 1946	31 July 1946	30 September 1946
		50,000 adópengő	136 × 83 mm	Value	Application clause	25 May 1946	30 May 1946	31 July 1946	30 September 1946
		100,000 adópengő	136 × 83 mm	Value	Application clause	28 May 1946	13 June 1946	31 July 1946	30 September 1946
		500,000 adópengő	136 × 83 mm	Value	Application clause	25 May 1946	30 May 1946	31 July 1946	30 September 1946
		1,000,000 adópengő	136 × 83 mm	Value	Application clause	25 May 1946	30 May 1946	31 July 1946	30 September 1946
		10,000,000 adópengő	136 × 83 mm	Value	Application clause	25 May 1946	18 July 1946	30 September 1946	30 September 1946
		100,000,000 adópengő	136 × 83 mm	Value	Application clause	25 May 1946	25 July 1946	30 September 1946	30 September 1946
		1,000,000,000 adópengő	136 × 83 mm	Value	Application clause	25 May 1946	never	-	-
These images are to scale at 0.7 pixel per millimetre. For table standards, see the banknote specification table.

== Savings certificates ==
The Hungarian Postal Savings Bank issued adópengő non-interest-bearing savings certificates (nem kamatozó pénztárjegy) in June 1946, which also served as legal tender.

Non-interest-bearing savings certificate
Image		Value	Dimensions	Description		Date of			
Obverse	Reverse	Value	Dimensions	Obverse	Reverse	printing	issue	withdrawal	lapse
		10,000 adópengő	[ ]	[ ]	100,000 adópengő				
