= Lever House =

Office building in Manhattan, New York

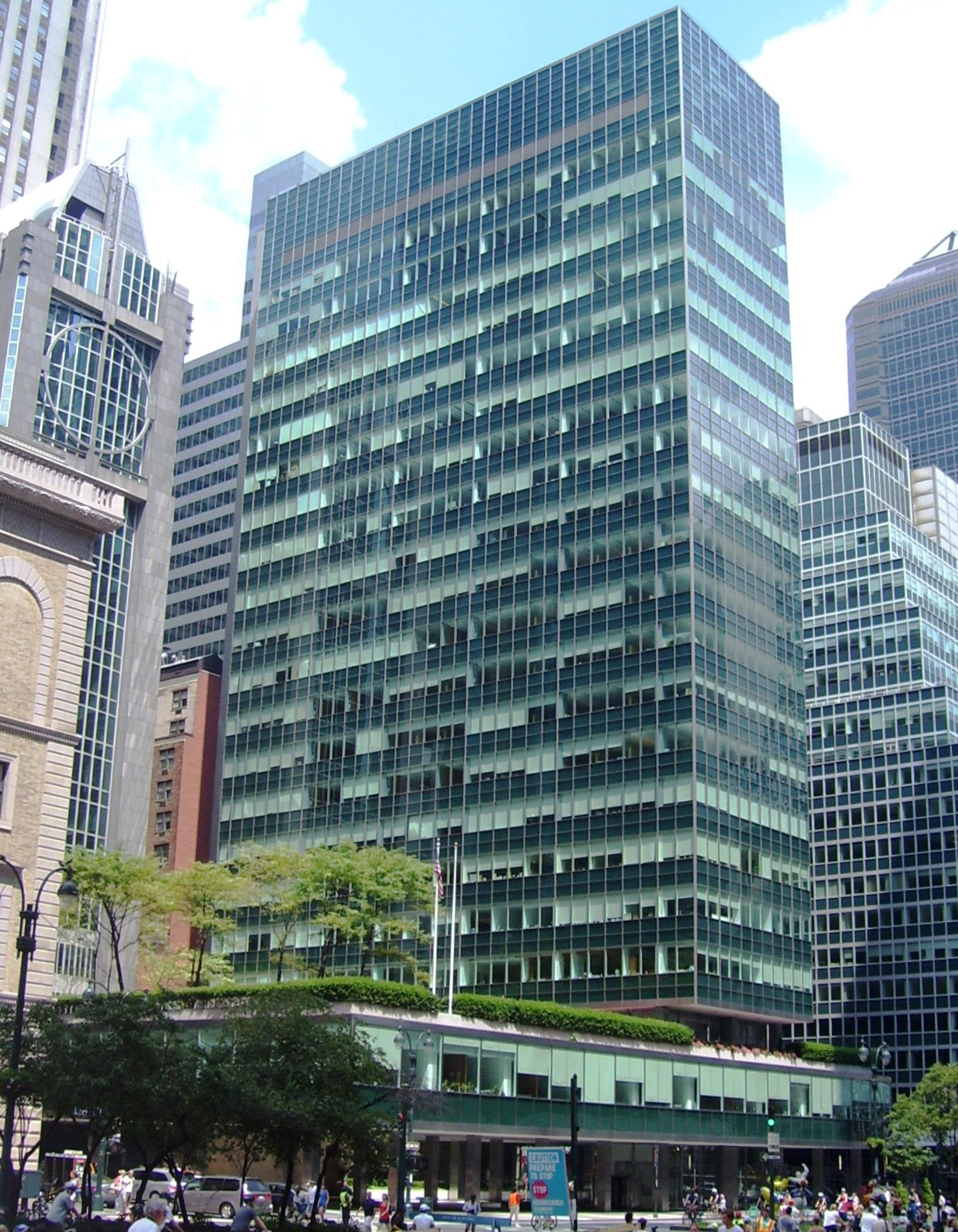
- Seen from Park Avenue and 53rd Street
- Interactive map of the Lever House area

General information
- Location: 390 Park Avenue; Manhattan, New York 10022; U.S.
- Coordinates: 40°45′35″N 73°58′22″W
- Construction started: 1950; 76 years ago
- Opened: April 29, 1952; 74 years ago
- Owner: Brookfield Properties, WatermanClark

Height
- Height: 307 ft (94 m)

Technical details
- Floor count: 21

Design and construction
- Architects: Gordon Bunshaft and Natalie de Blois of Skidmore, Owings & Merrill
- Main contractor: George A. Fuller Company

Website
- leverhousenyc.com
- Lever House
- U.S. National Register of Historic Places
- New York State Register of Historic Places
- New York City Landmark
- Built: 1950–1952
- Architectural style: International Style
- NRHP reference No.: 83004078
- NYSRHP No.: 06101.001710
- NYCL No.: 1277

Significant dates
- Added to NRHP: October 2, 1983
- Designated NYSRHP: August 11, 1983
- Designated NYCL: November 9, 1982

Lever House is a 307-foot-tall (94 m) office building at 390 Park Avenue in the Midtown Manhattan neighborhood of Manhattan in New York City, United States. Constructed from 1950 to 1952, the building was designed by Gordon Bunshaft and Natalie de Blois of Skidmore, Owings & Merrill (SOM) in the International Style, a 20th-century modern architectural style. It was originally the headquarters of soap company Lever Brothers, a subsidiary of Unilever. Lever House was the second high-rise in New York City with a glass curtain wall, after the United Nations Secretariat Building.

The building has 21 office stories topped by a triple-height mechanical section. At the ground story is a courtyard and public space, with the second story overhanging the plaza on a set of columns. The remaining stories are designed as a slab occupying the northern one-quarter of the site. The slab design was chosen because it conformed with the city's 1916 Zoning Resolution while avoiding the use of setbacks. There is about 260,000 square feet (24,000 m^{2}) of interior space in Lever House, making it much smaller than comparable office buildings in Midtown Manhattan.

The construction of Lever House changed Park Avenue in Midtown from an avenue with masonry apartment buildings to one with International-style office buildings. Several other structures worldwide copied the building's design. Lever House was intended solely for Lever Brothers' use, and its small size had prompted proposals to redevelop the site with a larger skyscraper. The building was nearly demolished in the 1980s, when Fisher Brothers proposed a 40-story tower on the site; afterward, it was narrowly approved as a New York City designated landmark in 1982 and was added to the National Register of Historic Places the next year. In 1997, Unilever relocated most of its offices out of Lever House, and Aby Rosen's RFR Realty took over the building. After SOM renovated the building between 2000 and 2001, Lever House was used as a standard office building with multiple tenants. Brookfield Properties and WatermanClark obtained a majority ownership stake in the building in 2020 and hired SOM to conduct another renovation in the early 2020s.

== Site ==
Lever House is at 390 Park Avenue, on the western sidewalk between 53rd Street and 54th Street, in the Midtown Manhattan neighborhood of Manhattan in New York City, United States. The land lot has a frontage of 200 feet (61 m) on Park Avenue, 192 feet (59 m) on 54th Street, and 155 feet (47 m) on 53rd Street, giving the lot a slight L shape. The lot has an area of 34,844 square feet (3,237.1 m^{2}). The Banco Santander building on 53rd Street abuts Lever House to the west, and the DuMont Building and Hotel Elysée on 54th Street occupy the same city block. Other nearby buildings include 399 Park Avenue directly across Park Avenue to the east; the Seagram Building diagonally across Park Avenue and 53rd Street to the southeast; and the CBS Studio Building, Park Avenue Plaza, and Racquet and Tennis Club Building across 53rd Street to the south. An entrance to the New York City Subway's Fifth Avenue/53rd Street station, served by the E, F, and <F> trains, is less than a block west along 53rd Street.

The site, which was part of Charles McEvers's farm in the early 19th century, had been developed by the 1870s with four- and five-story row houses. By the late 19th century, the Park Avenue railroad line ran in an open cut in the middle of Park Avenue. The line was covered with the construction of Grand Central Terminal in the early 20th century, spurring development in the surrounding area, which was known as Terminal City. The adjacent stretch of Park Avenue became a wealthy neighborhood with upscale apartments. Twenty-two rowhouses on 53rd and 54th Streets, owned by Robert Walton Goelet, formerly stood on Lever House's site. Twenty of these were demolished in 1936 and replaced by the Art Deco Normandie Theater, as well as a one-story "taxpayer" building that was intended to preserve the site for future development. The two rowhouses at 62 and 64 East 54th Street remained standing.

== Architecture ==
Lever House was designed by Gordon Bunshaft and Natalie de Blois of Skidmore, Owings & Merrill (SOM) in the International Style, a 20th-century modern architectural style. Lever House, the Seagram Building, the former Union Carbide Building, and the Pepsi-Cola Building are considered part of a grouping of International Style structures developed on Park Avenue from 46th to 59th Street during the mid-20th century. The building was constructed by main contractor George A. Fuller Company, with Jaros, Baum & Bolles as mechanical engineers and Weiskopf & Pickworth as structural engineers. Raymond Loewy Associates designed the interiors, since SOM had no interior design team when the building was completed in 1952.

Lever House was built and named for the Lever Brothers Company, a soap company that was an American subsidiary of Unilever. Lever House is 307 feet (94 m) tall and has 21 usable office stories topped by a triple-height mechanical space. The design largely incorporates ideas first proposed by Le Corbusier and Ludwig Mies van der Rohe in the 1920s. The building's glass-and-metal facade was similar to Mies's designs, while its raised-on-stilts courtyard was influenced by Le Corbusier's teachings.

=== Form ===
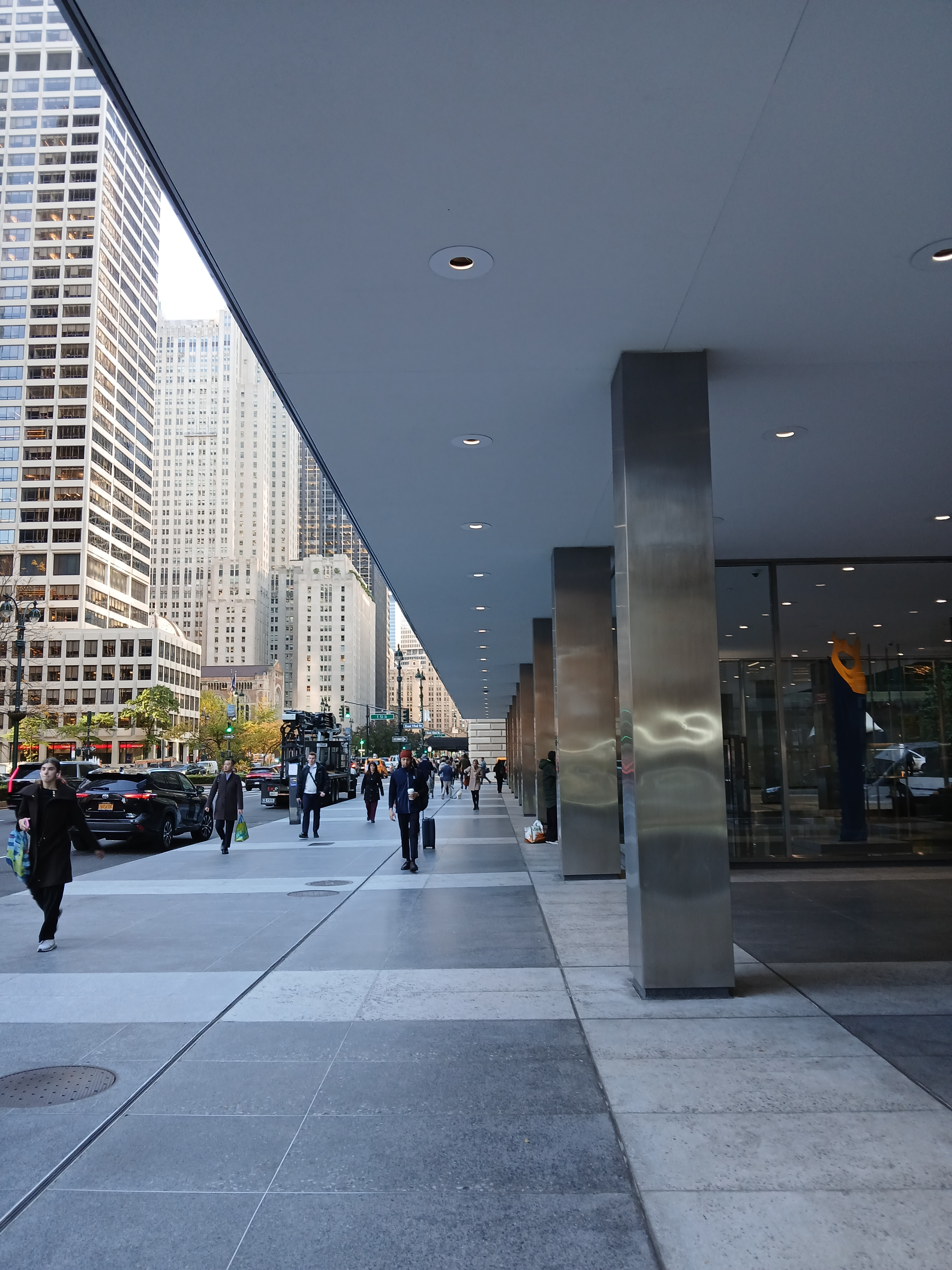
The columns on Park Avenue are set 10 feet (3.0 m) behind the lot boundary to avoid interfering with the walls of the Park Avenue railroad tunnel.

The ground level of Lever House consists predominantly of an outdoor plaza, paved in light- and dark-colored terrazzo, with some indoor sections. A rectangular planted garden with a pool is at the center of the plaza. Lever House's plaza is legally a privately owned public space. To prevent adverse possession, wherein the city government takes over ownership of the plaza, the building's owners have closed the plaza to the public for one day every year since its completion. Within the ground-story plaza are rectangular columns clad in stainless steel, which support the second story. The columns, which extend to the underlying rock, are set 10 feet (3.0 m) behind the lot boundary to avoid interfering with the walls of the Park Avenue railroad tunnel. The column layout gives the appearance that the upper stories are floating above ground and resembles an architectural arcade. The second story has an opening at its center, overlooking the planted garden; the opening creates the impression of a courtyard.

The third through twenty-first stories consist of a rectangular slab atop the northern portion of the site, occupying a quarter of the total lot area. The slab is only 53 feet (16 m) wide along Park Avenue, allowing all offices to be within 25 feet (7.6 m) of a window and thereby providing large amounts of natural light to tenants. Along 54th Street, the slab is 180 feet (55 m) wide and is set back 40 feet (12 m) from the street. The slab's positioning, with the shorter side along Park Avenue, allowed more natural light from the north and south facades and permitted natural light to illuminate the buildings to the south. This design also served a technical purpose, as it complied with the 1916 Zoning Resolution, intended to prevent new skyscrapers in New York City from overwhelming the streets with their sheer bulk. As a result of the slab's small size, Lever House has a floor area ratio (FAR) of 6:1, compared to a FAR of 12:1 at Rockefeller Center and a FAR of 25:1 at the Empire State Building.

The building's form was influenced by the 1916 Zoning Resolution, which required buildings to feature setbacks at progressively higher levels if the floor plates covered more than 25% of the land lot. Conversely, buildings could rise without setbacks if their floor plates covered at most 25% of their site. (Note: As per the 1916 Zoning Act, the wall of any given tower that faces a street could only rise to a certain height, proportionate to the street's width, at which point the building had to be set back by a given proportion. This system of setbacks would continue until the tower reaches a floor level in which that level's floor area was 25 percent that of the ground level's area. After that 25 percent threshold was reached, the building could rise without restriction. This law was superseded by the 1961 Zoning Resolution.) This theoretically allowed the construction of slab-like high-rises of unlimited height; in practice, Lever House was the city's first high-rise building to take advantage of this provision. Previous skyscrapers developed under this zoning code had been developed with setbacks as they rose. If all stories had contained the same area as the land lot, Lever House would have been equivalent to an eight-story structure. While Rockefeller Center's buildings had somewhat similar slab-like designs, the vast majority of the city's previous skyscrapers had been designed to fill the maximum volume allowed under the 1916 Zoning Resolution. Because Lever House is shorter than many other New York City skyscrapers, historian Carol Herselle Krinsky wrote that the building "barely qualifies as a skyscraper".

=== Facade ===
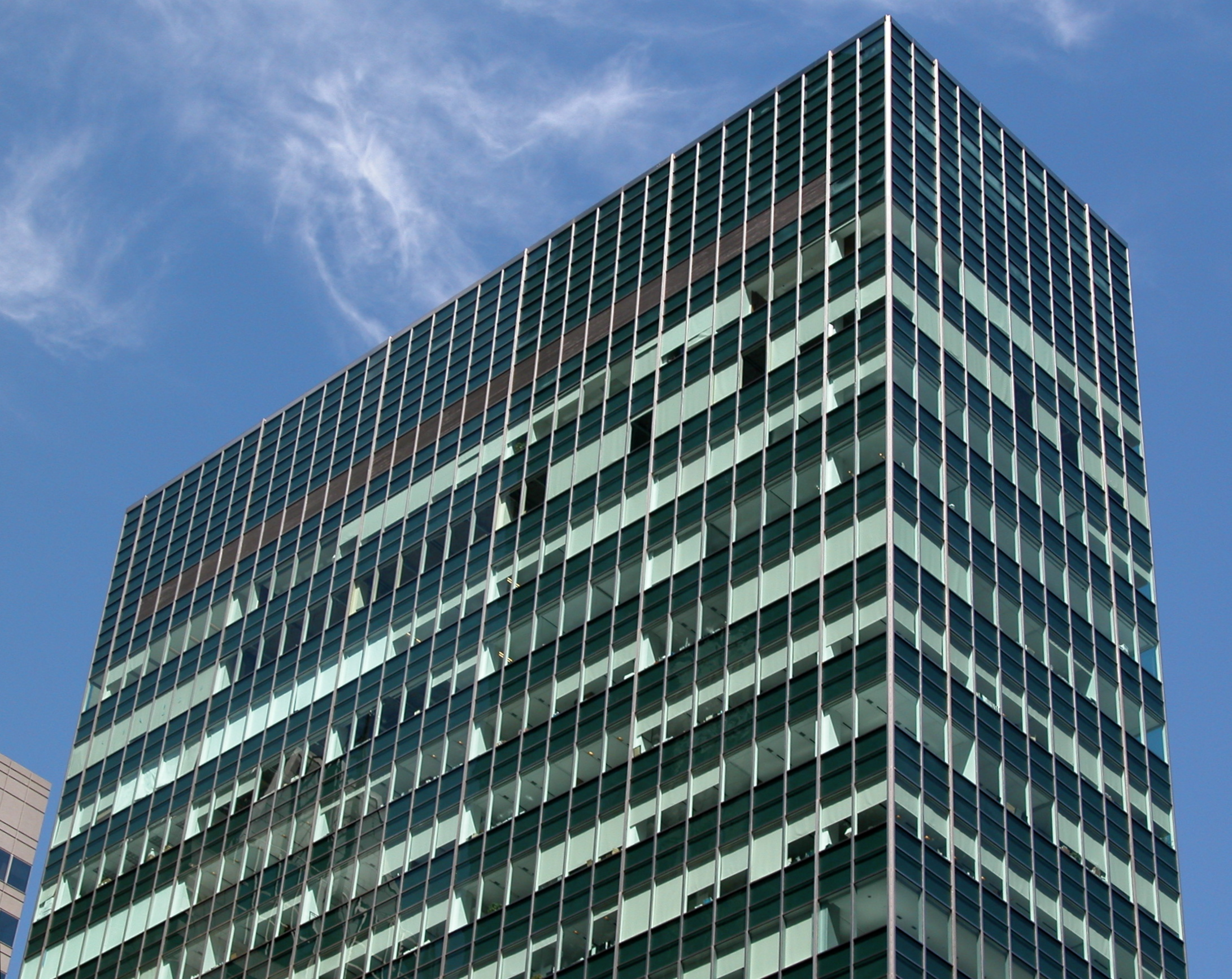
Upper stories

About 30% of the ground story is enclosed by glass and marble walls. Three revolving doors lead to a ground-level lobby near the northern half of the lot. The elevators and an auditorium and display area on the same floor are within a black marble enclosure at the northwestern corner of the building. At the lot's northwestern corner, a vehicular ramp from the western section of the 54th Street frontage leads to the basement garage and a loading dock. A white marble enclosure with stainless steel doors encloses an emergency exit stair at the southeastern corner of the ground floor.

Above the ground floor, all elevations of the facade contain a curtain wall with heat-absorbing glass panes and stainless steel. The curtain wall, the second to be installed in New York City after that of the United Nations Secretariat Building, was fabricated and installed by General Bronze, which had just completed the Secretariat Building's curtain wall. Unlike at the Secretariat, where the narrower elevations were faced in solid material, all elevations of Lever House are faced in glass. The curtain wall spans most of the facade but is interrupted at the building's northwestern corner, where there is a service core with masonry cladding.

==== Curtain wall ====
The curtain wall contains vertical steel mullions, which are connected to the building's floor plates. Each pair of mullions is separated by glass window panes, which cannot be opened. These consist of greenish panes for windows on each floor, as well as opaque bluish panels for spandrels between floors. The spandrel panels are glazed, and black cinderblock walls behind the spandrels give them a dark hue. They are separated from the window panes by horizontal mullions and muntin grilles. When installed, the spandrel panels were intended to conceal the masonry construction of the superstructure. The window panes are 7 feet 2 inches (2.18 m) tall, with the sill being 30 inches (760 mm) above the top of each floor plate, thereby concealing air-conditioning units beneath each window. The mullions are nearly flush with the glass, projecting about 1 inch (25 mm) from the outer surface of the glass panels. During nighttime, one of every five mullions is lit. Venetian blinds were used to reduce glare. During a renovation in the late 1990s and early 2000s, the curtain wall was moved forward by 1/4 inch (6.4 mm).

The curtain wall was intended to reduce the cost of operating and maintaining the property and, as designed, was intended to filter out thirty percent of heat from sunlight. The fixed-pane windows were cheaper to install and reduced the amount of particulate matter that entered the building, and they kept air conditioning costs down. Additionally, Unilever commissioned a window-washing scaffold, suspended from a 10.5-short-ton (9.4-long-ton; 9.5 t) "power plant car" on the roof. The first such device in the city, it could move vertically along steel rails embedded in the mullions. Kenneth M. Young of SOM designed the scaffold, having searched in vain for existing machinery that he could adapt for the building. Lever Brothers wanted the building to be "a symbol of everlasting cleanliness", and, according to Curbed, the scaffold was used for a publicity stunt that "used Lever-brand Surf soap to scrub the windows clean". Two window washers were hired to clean the facade every six days. Each of the building's 1,404 windows could be cleaned within ninety seconds; because the window panes were fixed, they could be cleaned in less than one-third of the time it took to wash a sash window.

The fixed-position window panes required that the building be air-conditioned, so steel grilles are also installed on the facade for ventilation intake. The curtain wall cost $28,000 more compared to normal sash windows, while the double glazing cost $135,000 and the window-washing equipment cost $50,000. However, the air conditioning system saved $90,000 in upfront costs, and it also saved $3,600 per year on energy costs and $1,000 per year on costs caused by hot and cold air escaping. The fixed window panes also saved $2,000 a year on window-washing costs compared to sash windows.

=== Structural features ===
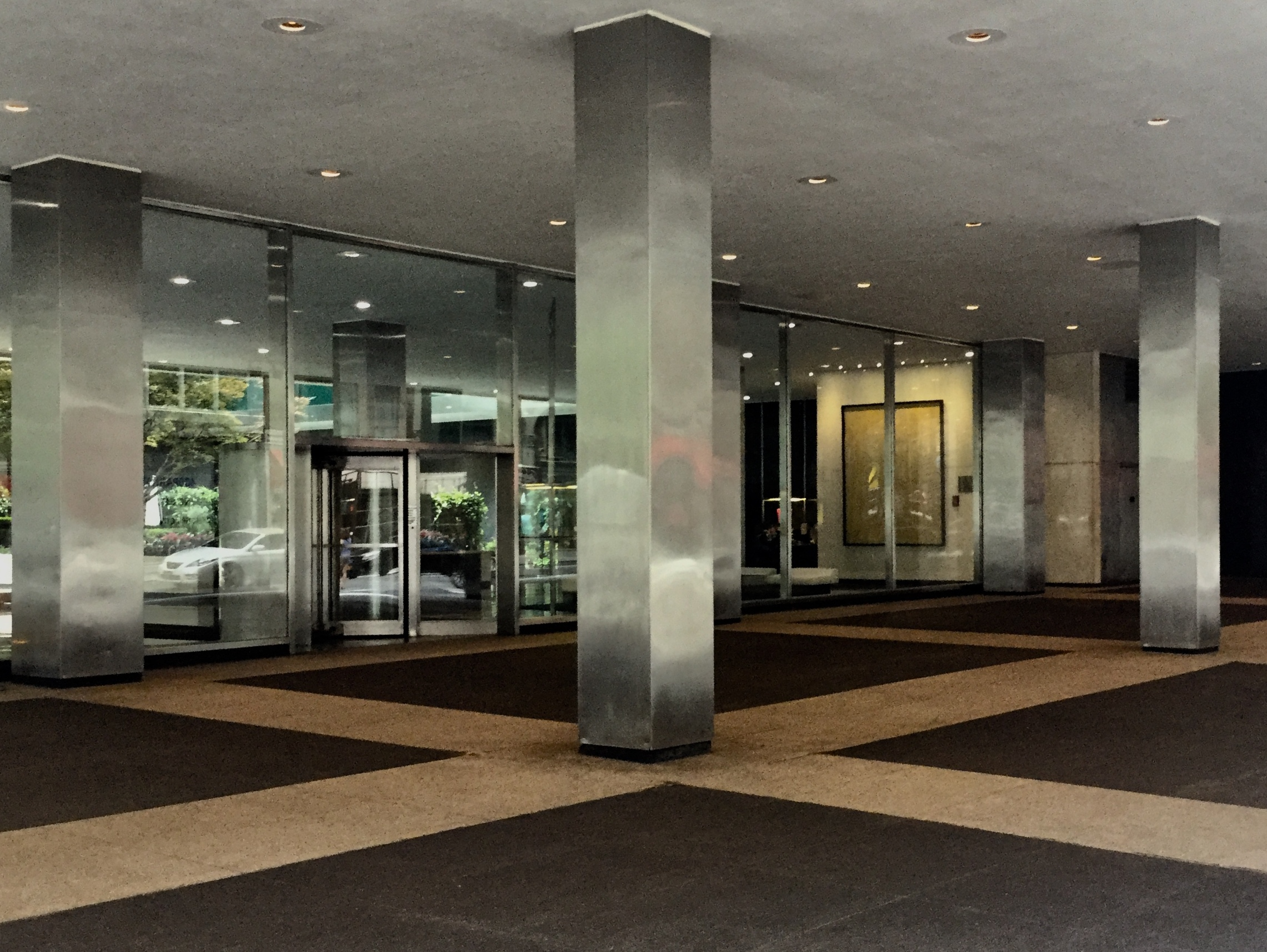
Ground-floor plaza

The internal superstructure consists of a skeleton of steel cellular beams, with floor plates made of reinforced concrete. Small sections of the floor plates outside the restrooms, elevator lobbies, and service core are supported by concrete arches. The dropped ceilings on each story are about 9 feet (2.7 m) high. The floor-to-floor height, as measured between the floor plates of adjacent stories, is 12 feet 4 inches (3.76 m). The west end of the slab is cantilevered 5 feet (1.5 m) from the furthest column while the east end is cantilevered 9 feet 8.5 inches (2.959 m). Lever House's wind bracing system consists of transverse bents placed at intervals of 28 feet (8.5 m), with one set of columns through the interior of the slab. The interior columns divide the office space asymmetrically into a wide bay and a narrower bay.

The building's utilities run through the service core on the west side of the slab and underneath each of the floor plates. Six elevators are provided in the service core: five serving the office stories and one service elevator between the first and third floors. A seventh elevator shaft was provided in the building to serve the upper stories if an additional elevator cab was deemed necessary. The core was placed on the west end of the slab so that, if Lever Brothers had ever built a westward addition to the tower, the elevators could serve the addition. An emergency stair was placed near the center of the building rather than in the core, thereby providing additional office space along the northern frontage of the building.

=== Interior ===
According to the New York City Department of City Planning, Lever House has a gross floor area of 262,945 square feet (24,428.4 m^{2}). (Note: Other sources give a different floor area. Media reports of the building's design, in 1950, indicated that it was supposed to contain about 280,000 square feet (26,000 m^{2}). The New York City Landmarks Preservation Commission states that Lever House was planned with 290,000 square feet (27,000 m^{2}).) All of the space was intended for Lever Brothers, which, in exchange for a more prominent structure, had been willing to forgo additional space that could have been rented to other tenants. The lack of shops highlighted Lever's status as the building's only tenant; as a Lever spokesperson said, "The fact is shops don't rent for much on Park Avenue. People buy on Fifth or Madison [Avenues]. All they do on Park is walk." A further consideration was that Lever Brothers wished for the building to be a corporate symbol for itself, rather than being shared with other tenants. In addition to its 21 usable stories and triple-height mechanical space, the building contained an employees' parking garage in the basement.

==== Ground and second stories ====
The enclosed section of the ground floor was largely oriented toward public use, with space for displays, a waiting room, a display kitchen, and an auditorium. Within the lobby are glass display cases with steel edges, which originally showcased Lever Brothers' products. Since 2003, the building's owner Aby Rosen has used the plaza and lobby as a gallery for the Lever House Art Collection. Exhibitions have included such works as Virgin Mother by Damien Hirst, Bride Fight by E.V. Day, The Hulks by Jeff Koons, The Snow Queen by Rachel Feinstein, Robert Towne by Sarah Morris, and several sculptures by Keith Haring and Tom Sachs. A 6,500-square-foot (600 m^{2}) portion of the ground story was converted into a restaurant in 2003, with rounded walls, five dining niches, and a 22-seat private balcony. As of 2023, the restaurant space is occupied by Casa Lever, whose design includes alcoves with black leather upholstery, black-and-white terrazzo floors, and banquette booths with wood frames.

The second and largest floor contained fan, stock, mail, and stenography rooms, in addition to the employees' lounge and medical suite. It contains 22,000 square feet (2,000 m^{2}) of space. The second floor has also been used for art installations, such as in 2018, when the second and ground floors were lit as part of Peter Halley's New York, New York.

Above the southern three-quarters of the building was a third-story roof terrace clad with red tile, which was outfitted with shuffleboard courts for employees. The terrace originally functioned as a roof garden, adjoining an employee kitchen, dining room, and cafeteria inside. In the early 2020s, the third-story terrace was integrated into Lever Club, a 13,540-square-foot (1,258 m^{2}) amenity area for the building's tenants. The space was designed by Los Angeles–based architectural firm Marmol Radziner, and is operated by Sant Ambroeus Hospitality Group as of 2023. Lever Club is decorated with green marble walls and floors; the space includes conference rooms, lounge seats, and a bar and restaurant. White birch trees were planted on the terrace during the 2020s renovation.

==== Office stories ====
The offices of Unilever and its subsidiaries occupied the remaining floors, and there was an executive penthouse on the 21st floor. Each of the upper stories within the slab contains 8,700 square feet (810 m^{2}) of gross floor area. The triple-story mechanical penthouse is atop the 21st floor and includes air conditioning machinery, elevator machinery and a water tower.

On each story, about 6,000 square feet (560 m^{2}) is used for office space, excluding area taken up by closets, elevators, restrooms, and walls. At Lever House's completion, much of Lever Brothers' staff was female, so the offices were designed as spaces that "women would enjoy working in". As such, the building used nine primary color schemes, and the floors, linoleum, desks, and acoustic-tile ceilings were colored gray-beige. Each of the executive offices had their own style, and four of these offices had fireplaces. Gypsum partitions on each of the office floors were attached to the mullions. The building was also constructed with air conditioning on each floor, an automatic fire alarm system, and a mail conveyor system. During the building's 2020s renovation, the ceiling heights were increased, and the curtain wall was thinned, creating slightly more office space at the perimeter.

== History ==
Unilever was formed in 1929 from the merger of British soap company Lever Brothers Limited and Dutch margarine firm Margarine Unie. Unilever's United States subsidiary was known as Lever Brothers Company and was initially headquartered in Cambridge, Massachusetts. The subsidiary opened offices at 445 Park Avenue, three blocks north of the present building's site, in 1947.

=== Development and early years ===
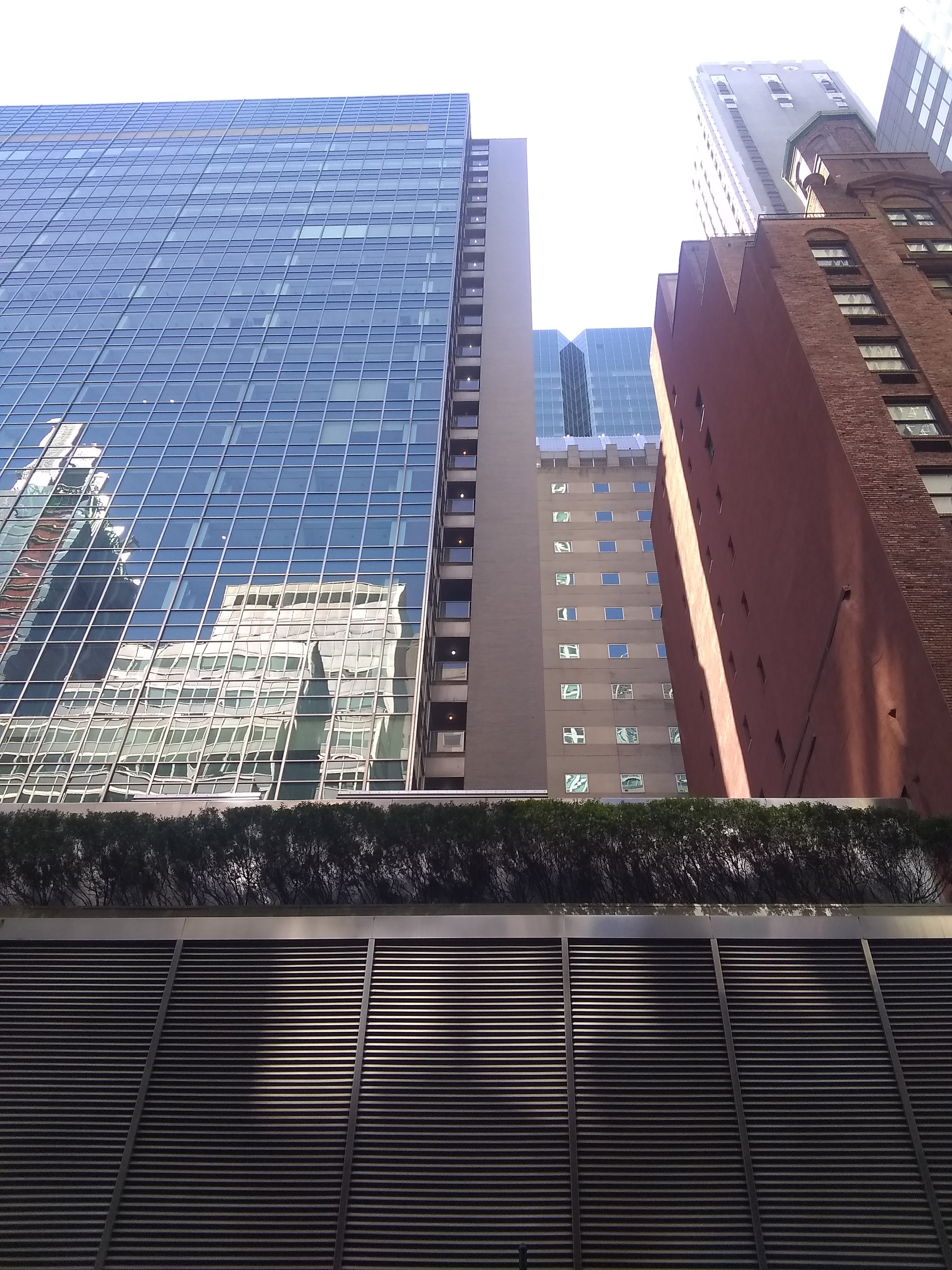
54th Street facade, showing the masonry "spine" at center right

The company began acquiring land on Park Avenue from 53rd to 54th Street around June 1949, leasing the lots from Robert Walton Goelet's estate. The negotiations were made in secret, involving fourteen sets of lawyers, numerous brokers, and several shell companies. As finalized, the lease was to run for sixty years. The main broker behind the transaction, S. Dudley Nostrand, won the award for the "most ingenious and beneficial Manhattan real estate transaction of 1949" from the Title Guarantee and Trust Company.

On October 5, 1949, Lever Brothers announced a wide-ranging expansion program within the United States. The company's president, Charles Luckman, announced the executive offices would be moved from Cambridge to New York City that December, taking temporary space at two buildings in Manhattan. A new executive headquarters known as Lever House, to be built on Park Avenue from 53rd to 54th Street, was planned to the firm's subsidiaries upon its expected completion in late 1951. SOM was hired to design Lever House when it was announced. Luckman, who also held an architect's license, helped influence the design, though he did not make any formal proposals. Although SOM had prepared plans for slab-like buildings in Chicago for a Lever Brothers headquarters, the company decided upon a New York City headquarters because "the price one pays for soap is 89 percent advertising [...] and the advertising agencies of America were there."

In designing Lever House, SOM focused on Lever Brothers' desire for 150,000 square feet (14,000 m^{2}) of office space all to itself. After months of deliberation, Bunshaft drew up plans for a slab occupying 25% of the site; to permit larger floor sizes, Lever Brothers bought an additional 3,300 square feet (310 m^{2}) of land to the west. Luckman left Lever Brothers in January 1950 because of unspecified disagreements with Unilever executives. He went to design several buildings of his own, initially prompting false speculation that Lever Brothers had fired him due to Lever House's design. Final plans for Lever House were filed with the New York City Department of Buildings in April 1950. The plans were publicized the same month. Demolition of the four buildings on Lever House's site was scheduled to commence immediately after the plans were announced. The George A. Fuller Company received the contract to construct Lever House in August. A topping out ceremony for the steel frame occurred in April 1951.

The building officially opened on April 29, 1952, with a tour and a ceremony attended by mayor Vincent R. Impellitteri. Lever Brothers leased the building from the Metropolitan Life Insurance Company, taking over the responsibility of maintaining it. The New York Times estimated that the promotional value of Lever House amounted to $1 million per year, substantially more than the estimated $200,000 annual loss due to the lack of retail shops. The building also had an average of 40,000 yearly visitors, many of whom were architecture students, and employee turnover was just over one-third of the average turnover for the city's other large companies. In Lever House's early years, the enclosed ground-story space was used for art exhibitions. These included the Sculptors Guild's annual exhibit as well as an annual heliography exhibition. Lever Brothers commissioned Robert Wiegand in 1970 to paint a 37-by-52-foot (11 by 16 m) mural, Leverage, along a wall adjacent to the third-story courtyard.

=== Late 20th century ===
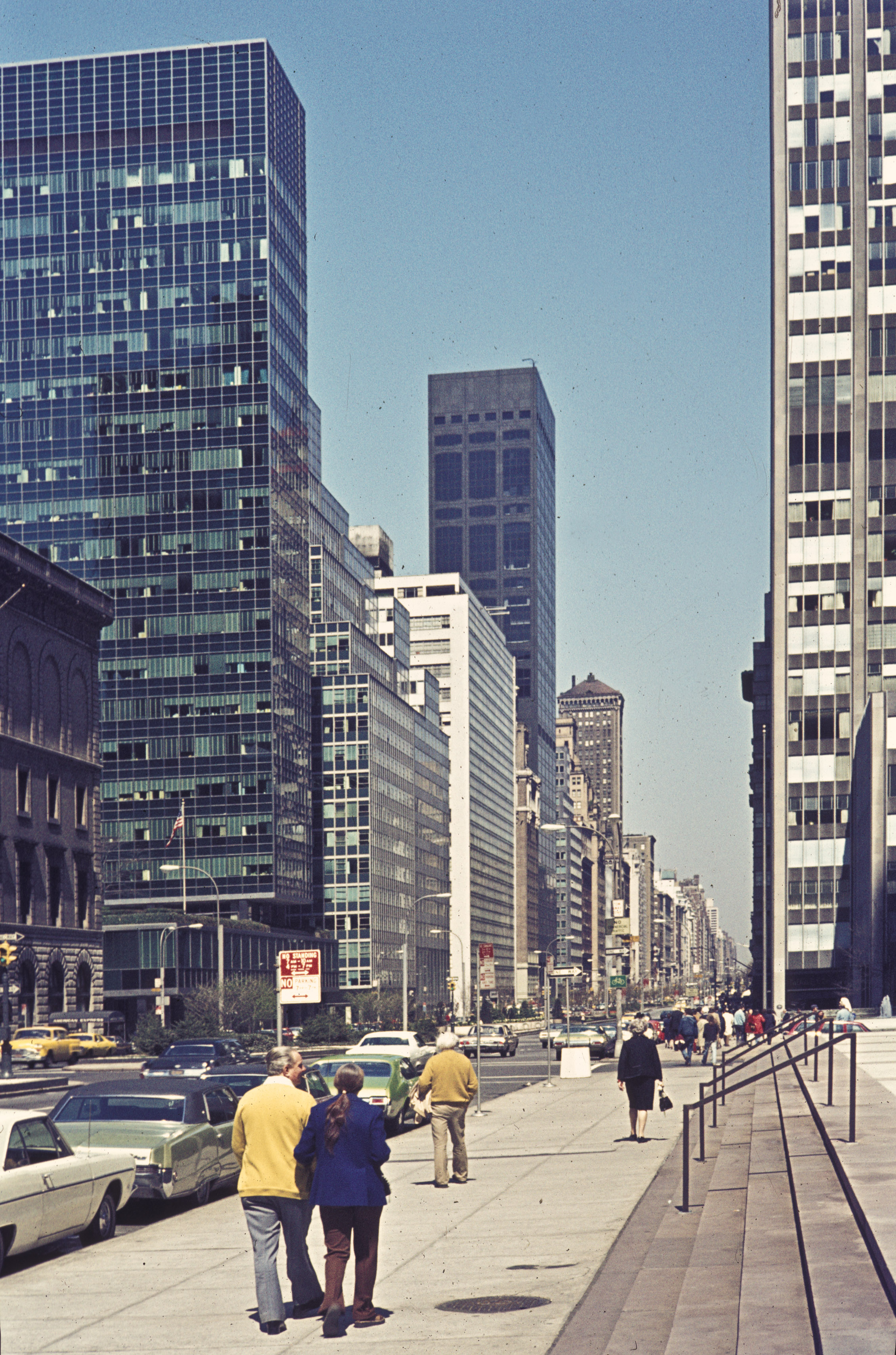
The building in 1973, at left

Lever House's small floor–area ratio became a drawback for real estate developers in the years after its completion, even though that aspect remained popular among the public. The Lever Brothers Company rejected numerous rumors that the building would be replaced by a larger structure, even advertising the building's 25th anniversary in 1977 with a full-page New York Times ad. At that time, Lever House had hosted more than 250 exhibitions.

==== Proposed demolition and preservation ====
Until the 1980s, relatively few preservationists were concerned about the demolition of curtain walls that had been completed between the 1950s and the 1970s. Preservationists only started to express concern in 1982, after Fisher Brothers had signed a contract to purchase the fee position for the underlying land. The firm wished to replace Lever House, as well as the neighboring Jofa Building on 53rd Street, with a 40-story building containing three times the floor area. Lever Brothers rejected media reports that it was considering moving to New Jersey. Bunshaft said at the time that he never thought the building's small size would have resulted in its demolition.

The plans prompted preservationists to request that the New York City Landmarks Preservation Commission (LPC) consider designating the building as a city landmark. On November 9, 1982, the LPC designated Lever House as a landmark. LPC rules specified that New York City individual landmarks be at least 30 years old, making Lever House the city's youngest landmark at that time. It was also the first time that the LPC had ever granted landmark status to a building that was exactly 30 years old. Fisher Brothers opposed the landmark status. The firm in charge of designing Fisher Brothers' proposed building, Swanke Hayden Connell Architects, prepared a white paper for the LPC, which described Lever House as "undistinguished and not worthy of preservation". George Klein, who was in contract to buy the lease on the building itself from Metropolitan Life, favored landmark status. At the time, Klein was trying to develop a structure on the Jofa Building site and incorporate Lever House into the new development. Lever Brothers also supported the designation, but it had hired its own architectural firm, Welton Becket and Associates, to prepare plans for the Jofa site.

The landmark status had to be ratified by the New York City Board of Estimate to become binding. If the landmark status was ratified, the building could not be demolished unless the landmark status caused significant economic hardship even with tax exemptions. The Board of Estimate was to vote on the landmark designation in January 1982, but this was delayed. It was unknown whether the Board of Estimate had enough votes to uphold the building's landmark designation, since several board members had expressed their wish that the site be redeveloped more lucratively. Among the reasons Fisher Brothers had cited in their attempt to replace Lever House was the structure's deteriorated condition. Welton Becket and Associates estimated the cost of restoring Lever House at between $12 and 15 million.

In February 1983, Fisher Brothers publicized plans for its 40-story tower, which they claimed would create 1,500 jobs and generate $9.4 million annually in taxes. The same month, several hundred preservationists, such as architect Philip Johnson and former U.S. first lady Jacqueline Kennedy Onassis, protested in favor of ratifying Lever House's landmark designation. Mayor Ed Koch, a member of the Board of Estimate, published a letter to the other board members in which he asked them to support designation. The Board of Estimate ratified the landmark status that March. The landmark status was approved with a slim 6–5 majority, as all five of the city's borough presidents voted against the designation. Lever House's preservation was described by The Christian Science Monitor as "sparking heated debate only in New York City" because, nationally, there was a trend in favor of preservation at the time. Lever House was added to the National Register of Historic Places on October 2, 1983.

==== Building decay and ownership changes ====
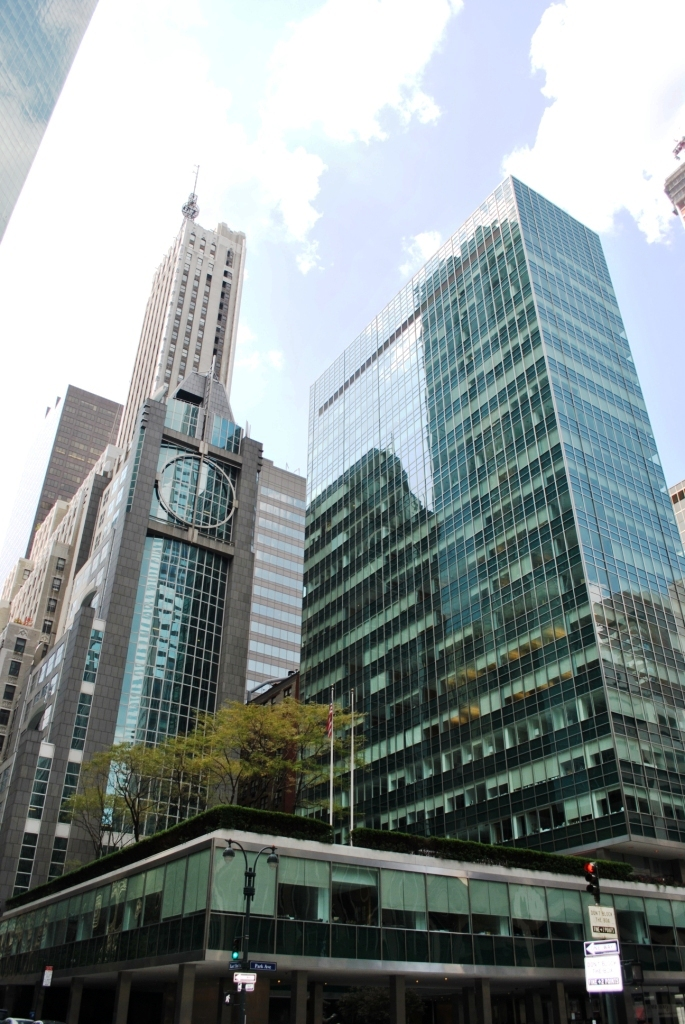
Seen in 2014

As a result of Lever House's relatively small floor area, the land lot had 315,000 square feet (29,300 m^{2}) of unused development rights, which under New York City zoning code could be transferred to nearby buildings. However, the LPC had not yet determined whether such a transfer would be applicable to Lever House. Accordingly, the landmark designation caused an impasse between the Fisher Brothers, Klein, and Lever Brothers. Both developers' plans were based on full control of the building and land, as well as lease negotiations with Lever Brothers, whose lease was still active for another twenty-seven years.

Lever Brothers sued the Fisher Brothers in June 1983, alleging the latter was still attempting to gain ownership of Lever House so it could be demolished, thereby breaking Lever Brothers' lease. The Fisher Brothers relented that October, agreeing to sell its fee position to Klein. Sarah Korein acquired the land under Lever House from the Goelet estate in 1985, though Unilever continued to lease the building. Her daughter, Elysabeth Kleinhans, recalled that Korein referred to Lever House as her "Mona Lisa".

Through the 1980s, the building's blue-green glass facade deteriorated due to weather and the limitations of the original fabrication and materials. Water seeped behind the vertical mullions, causing the carbon steel within and around the glazing pockets to rust and expand. This corrosion led to most of the spandrel glass panels breaking. At least some of these structural failures were attributed to the relatively new technologies used at Lever House. According to documents filed with the city government in 1995, forty to fifty percent of the original glass had been replaced; many of these replacements took place without SOM's knowledge and were visibly different from the original panes. Consulting engineer Vincent Stramandinoli proposed erecting a new glass curtain wall in front of the original curtain wall, which was planned to be removed. In 1996, Unilever proposed replacing the curtain wall with an identical wall designed by David Childs of SOM. Childs said at the time that only one percent of the original glass remained. The LPC approved Childs's plan, but the proposal was not further acted upon in 1999.

=== Restoration and office tenancies ===
==== RFR operation ====
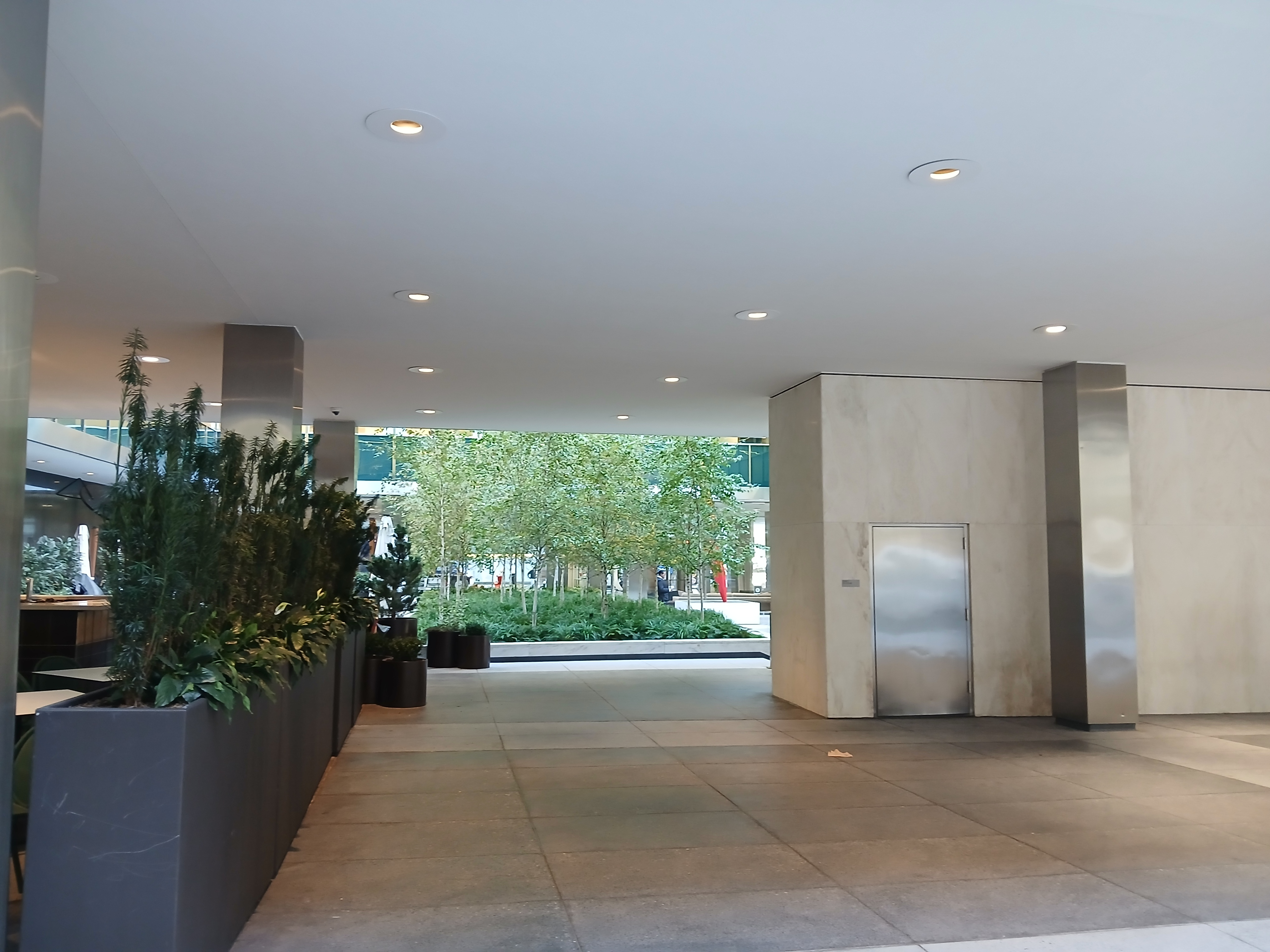
Ground-floor plaza with dining area, looking toward the courtyard

Unilever announced in September 1997 that it was moving its Lever Brothers division to Greenwich, Connecticut. Following the announcement, Lever Brothers slowly began vacating the building, leaving Unilever on only the top four floors. At the time, Lever Brothers had been the building's only tenant. Shortly before Korein's death in 1998, real estate magnates Aby Rosen and Michael Fuchs acquired the building lease, although Korein's family retained the land lease. Under the agreement, Rosen's company RFR Holding was obliged to perform a comprehensive restoration of the facade. RFR negotiated a lease-back deal allowing Unilever to remain on the top four floors. The Korein family remained the owner of the land. RFR hired graphic designer Michael Bierut to expand the building's typeface, which previously had only included the seven unique letters in the name "Lever House".

In 1999, RFR Holding announced that it planned to spend $25 million (equivalent to $48 million in 2025) on capital improvements, including a restoration of the building's curtain wall and public spaces, designed by SOM. Work began in 2000, at which point curtain wall specialist Gordon H. Smith estimated that the building only retained about a half-dozen of its original spandrel panels. The deteriorated steel subframe and rusted mullions and caps were replaced. New panes of 1/4-inch-thick (6.4 mm) vision glass were installed, which were nearly identical to the originals but met modern energy codes. The curtain wall was also moved 1/4 inch (6.4 mm) outward on all sides. The curtain wall's design caused condensation to accumulate in the cracks of the curtain wall over the years. The renovation also included the addition of marble benches, as well as a sculpture garden with works by Isamu Noguchi, to the building's plaza. Ken Smith Landscape Architect had proposed revising one of Noguchi's two unbuilt designs for a sculpture garden, but the Noguchi Foundation had rejected the proposals, leading Smith to redesign the garden using eight of Noguchi's sculptures. These elements had been part of the original plans for the building and were never realized.

The renovation was completed by 2001. Following the renovation, Lever House became a standard office building with multiple tenants. Metal processor Alcoa (later Arconic) signed a lease in 1999 for five stories in the building. Other tenants included American General Financial Group, Cosmetics International, and investment bank Thomas Weisel Partners. In 2003, Lever House Restaurant became the first restaurant to open at Lever House. The windowless restaurant space, which was designed by Marc Newson, covered 6,500 square feet (600 m^{2}) and was hidden behind the public plaza's western wall. The restaurant closed in early 2009 and was replaced by Casa Lever, which opened later that year.

In the early 2010s, the administration of mayor Michael Bloomberg proposed the Midtown East rezoning, which allowed the Korein estate to sell the unused development rights from Lever House for up to $75 million. The rezoning was passed in 2016, enabling the Korein estate to sell the development rights. At the same time, although RFR had an annual ground lease payment of $6 million, the company faced a steep increase to $20 million when the lease was scheduled to reset in 2023. Because of the ground lease, RFR had trouble refinancing Lever House. By early 2018, RFR was three years behind on its rent payments and mortgage bondholders were looking to foreclose on the property, a move that could potentially cancel all of the building's office leases. Bondholders initiated foreclosure proceedings that May.

==== Brookfield and WatermanClark ownership ====
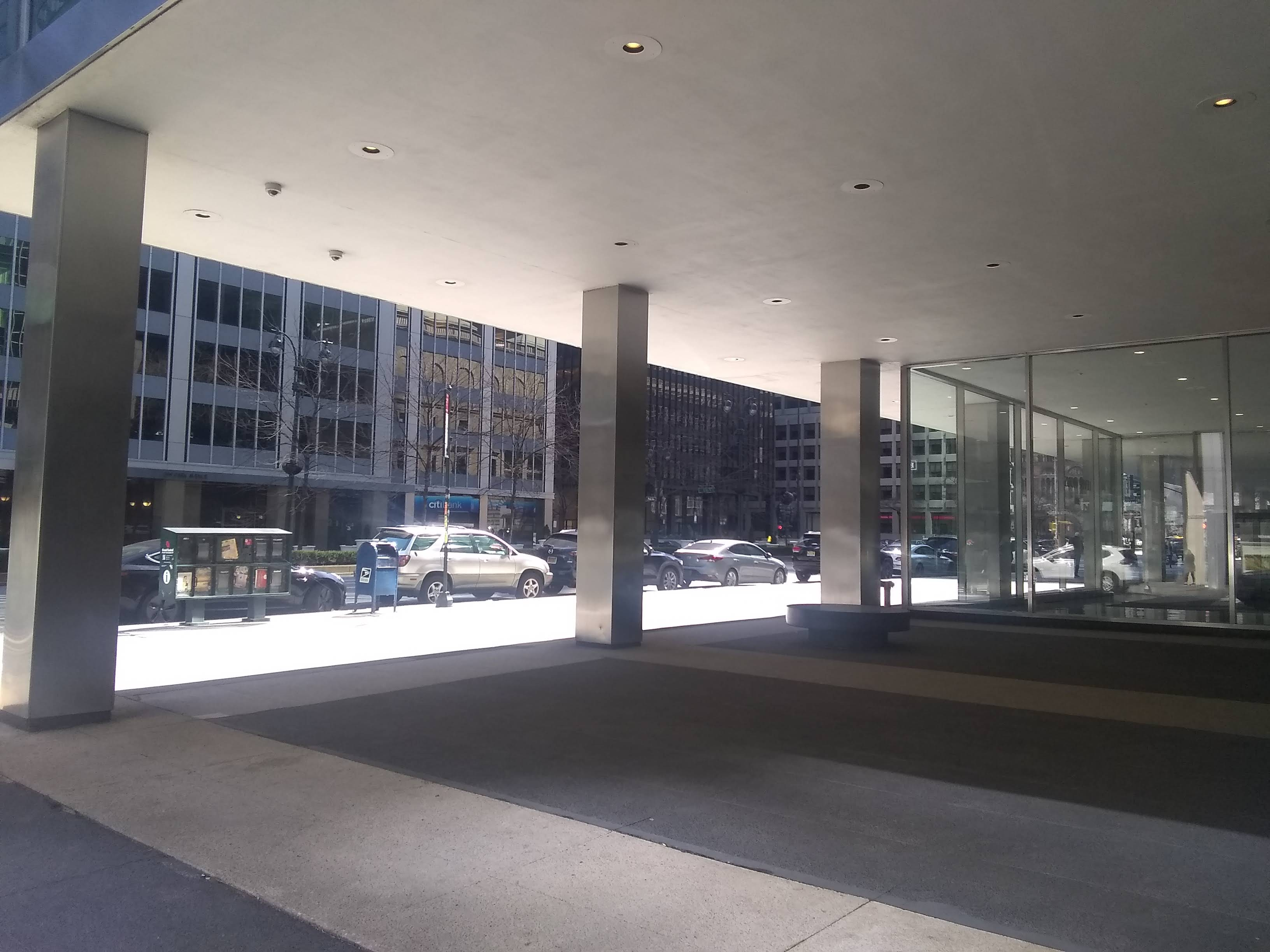
View of the ground-floor privately owned public space under Lever House's base

A joint venture between Brookfield Properties and Waterman Interests (later WatermanClark) bought the ground lease from RFR in July 2018. Brookfield and Waterman purchased RFR's debt load in early 2019 for $12.8 million (equivalent to $16.1 million in 2025), a $68 million decrease from the debt's original value. RFR filed two lawsuits against Brookfield and Waterman during late 2019. One was related to the lack of sprinklers in the building, in which RFR was threatened with lease termination, while the other alleged that Waterman Interests had fraudulently taken over the ground lease using confidential information. In May 2020, RFR gave a majority stake in Lever House's operation to Brookfield and WatermanClark. The new owners decided to renovate Lever House, as all tenants had left during the COVID-19 pandemic.

In July 2021, SOM proposed restoring the building's historic design elements, replacing non-historic features, and adding an entrance to Casa Lever from the ground story. A lounge for tenants and visitors would be created on the third floor, and a new HVAC system would be installed. Additionally, the architects planned to replace or clean the finishings and re-landscape Lever House's plaza. The LPC approved the renovation plans in January 2022, and work started shortly afterward. Workers replaced broken pieces of black limestone with slabs from a defunct quarry that had provided the building's original limestone, and they pumped dry air into the curtain wall to remove built-up condensation. The Lever Club amenity space was built on the third floor, and mechanical equipment on the upper stories was upgraded. The Casa Lever restaurant was also refurbished in early 2023 by the firm David Bucovy Architect, reopening that June. Casa Lever's renovation included the new entrance and the restoration of interior architectural features. By November 2023, SOM had finished renovating Lever House. Following the renovation, in early 2025, real estate firm CBRE Group leased six stories.

== Impact ==
=== Reception ===
==== Contemporary ====
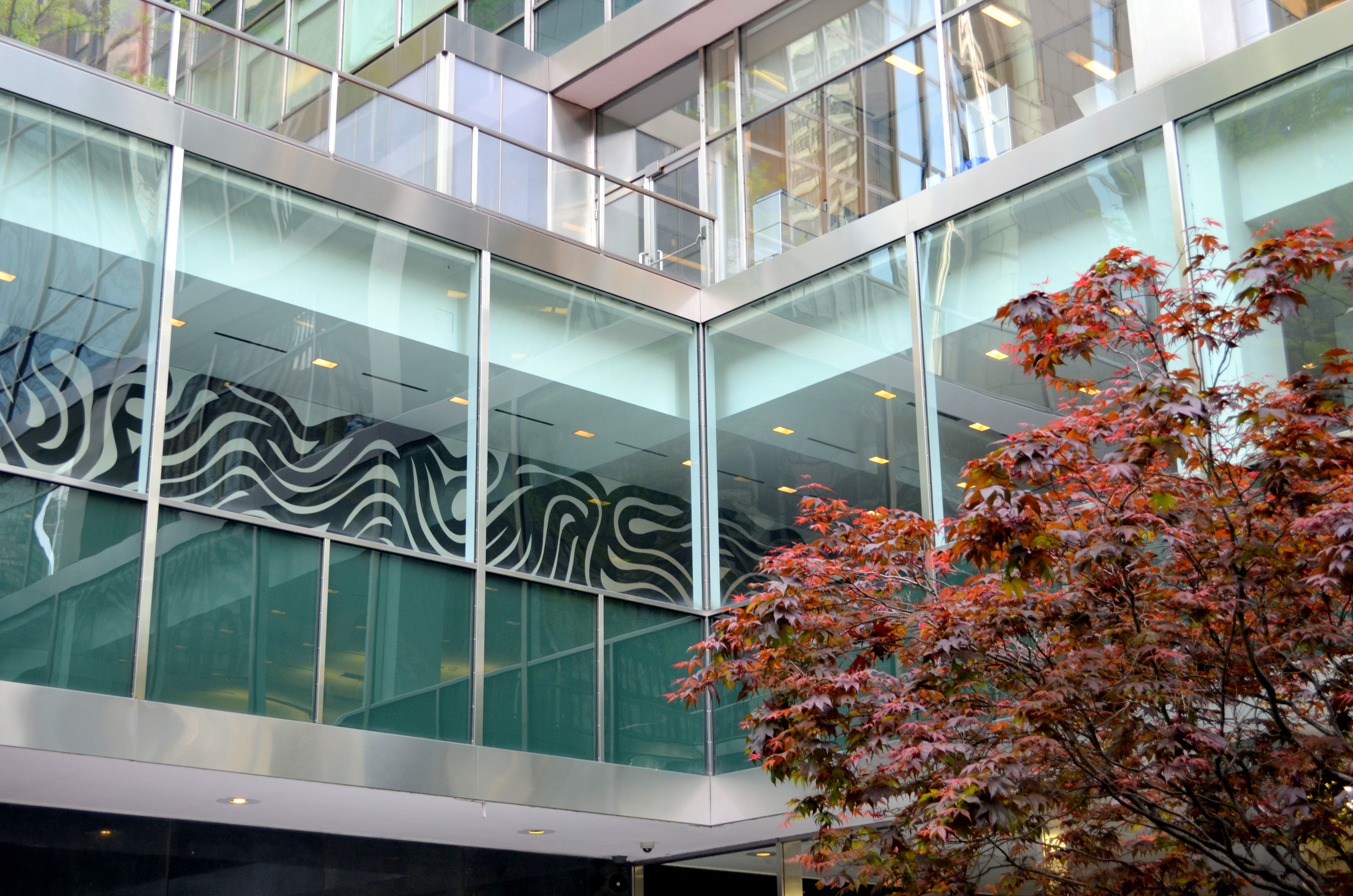
View from the building's courtyard

In 1950, before construction began, Architectural Forum described Lever House as "infinitely more spirited and dignified than any other commercial office building" in the city. Upon its completion, the same journal wrote, "it is the shape of this building which is impressive, more even than the gleaming materials". New York Times architectural critic Aline B. Louchheim wrote that Lever House was "beautiful as well as functional". British art historian Nikolaus Pevsner told The New York Times shortly afterward, "The fact that such an extraordinary building was commissioned from a firm rather than an individual genius [...] is different from" continental Europe. Architectural Record wrote of the plaza: "In this aspect, the entire structure is thoughtful, pleasant, and a decided advance over the average speculative building." Fellow modernist architect Eero Saarinen said that Bunshaft "has created one of the finest buildings of our times".

Although historian Carol Herselle Krinsky wrote that the building "received universal praise from architects, critics, and laymen" for its unusual style, not all of the initial commentary was positive. Luckman reflected in the Los Angeles Times that financiers had nicknamed it "Luckman's folly" during its construction, while Louchheim found the interiors and the penthouse offices unappealing. The architect Frank Lloyd Wright called Lever House a "box on sticks" in a 1952 speech at the Waldorf Astoria, and Edward P. Morgan said the same year that "a 10-year-old boy could have done better with a Meccano set".

==== Retrospective ====
Commentary on the building was mixed. A 1956 Architectural Record article deemed it the third most significant structure of the past hundred years, and in a poll of 500 architects two years later, Lever House was deemed one of the "seven wonders of American architecture". In a 1957 article about architecture on Park Avenue, Ada Louise Huxtable wrote that "the staples of our civilization—soap, whiskey and chemicals" (in reference to Lever House, the Seagram Building, and the Union Carbide Building) were represented in the "monuments" then being developed on Park Avenue. According to British art critic Reyner Banham in 1962, Lever House "gave architectural expression to an age just as the age was being born". By contrast, architectural critic Lewis Mumford, writing for The New Yorker in 1958, found the slab "curiously transitory and ephemeral". Henry Hope Reed Jr., in his 1959 book The Golden City, contrasted a picture of Lever House with one of the Postum Building at 250 Park Avenue, captioning Lever House only with the words "no comment". Art historian Vincent Scully said in 1961 that Lever House interrupted the landscape of Park Avenue without regard to the existing architecture, and other detractors noted the lack of benches in the courtyard.

At the building's 25th anniversary in 1977, architectural critic Paul Goldberger wrote that Lever House had been "a stunning act of corporate philanthropy". Architectural historian William H. Jordy thought Lever House was a paragon for buildings developed after World War II, while Goldberger wrote in his 1979 book The City Observed that Lever House was as influential to architecture as the Daily News Building and 330 West 42nd Street had been. Washington Post reporter Benjamin Forgey wrote in 1982 that the plaza was "dark and uninviting", though he thought the base and tower were well-proportioned and that the trees above the plaza helped beautify Park Avenue. In 1988, Krinsky wrote that Lever House had given "the single greatest boost to SOM's reputation". Architectural Record magazine described Lever House in 2000 as one of the United States' "most famous [architectural] works of the mid-20th century" that were protected as local or national landmarks.

Following the building's early-2020s renovation, architectural critic Justin Davidson wrote that the modern structure "is a bracing illusion, a gorgeously appointed set." A critic for The Architect's Newspaper said in 2023: "Lever House continues to benefit not only from good bones, but steadfast stewardship." Conversely, Audrey Wachs wrote for Curbed in 2022 that Lever House had become less practical as an office building during the preceding years, existing mostly as a landmark.

=== Architectural recognition ===
In 1952, the year of Lever House's completion, Office Management and Equipment magazine awarded the building "Office of the Year". The American Institute of Architects (AIA) gave the building an Honor Award the same year, the first such award ever distributed by the organization. Lever House also received the Fifth Avenue Association's award for "best New York building" constructed between 1952 and 1953. The AIA further recognized Lever House in 1980 with a Twenty-five Year Award, celebrating the longevity of its design. Yale School of Architecture professor Elihu Rubin told Time magazine in 2022, "There's probably hardly a survey course in American architecture that doesn't mention Lever House."

=== Design influence ===
According to the LPC, Lever House's design was widely seen by historians as a major advancement in the International Style. Charles Jencks called Lever House's curtain wall a step in "penultimate development and acceptance" of the International Style. Krinsky described the all-glass curtain wall as innovative for a high-rise, contrasting with the low-rise massing of the General Motors Technical Center or the partially-masonry facades of the Commonwealth or UN Secretariat buildings. Robert Furneaux Jordan felt the building's court "set a precedent that may lift New York to a new level among world capitals". Lever House, along with SOM's later Inland Steel Building in Chicago, also helped popularize post–World War II modernist architecture in the United States.

Following Lever House's completion, several glass-wall skyscrapers such as the Seagram Building and 28 Liberty Street were built in New York City. Similar structures were erected elsewhere, many of which were of lower quality than the original. Commercial buildings were developed on the adjacent blocks of Park Avenue, and many of the residential structures on that street were replaced with largely commercial International Style skyscrapers during the 1950s and 1960s. One of the Seagram Building's architects, Philip Johnson, cited Lever House specifically as a forebear to his structure. The facade of the nearby 430 Park Avenue, which was remodeled in a style resembling Lever House's facade, appeared in the opening credits of the 1959 film North by Northwest.

Lever House's design was also copied internationally; as Nicholas Adams wrote in 2019, "Lever House had represented a clarion call for modernity, and it was widely imitated." These structures included the Banco de Bogotá headquarters in Bogotá in 1960; Ankara's Emek Business Center, Turkey's first curtain-walled skyscraper, in 1965; the high-rise tower of Berlin's Europa-Center in 1965; and the Hydroproject headquarters in Moscow in 1968. Lever House's influence also spread to Scandinavia with Copenhagen's SAS Radisson, designed in 1960, as well as numerous consular offices in Germany, designed in the 1950s by SOM. According to Adams, the design was ultimately copied more than a dozen times around the world.

== See also ==
- List of New York City Designated Landmarks in Manhattan from 14th to 59th Streets
- National Register of Historic Places listings in Manhattan from 14th to 59th Streets
- Autotalo, a building in Helsinki, Finland, modeled after Lever House
