= CORE Club =

Social club in New York City

Coordinates: 40°45′42″N 73°58′28″W

The CORE: Club (styled CORE:) is a private members' club in New York City founded in 2005 by Jennie Enterprise. From 2005 to 2023 the CORE Club was based at 66 East 55th Street in Manhattan before moving to 711 Fifth Avenue in September 2023.

The price to join CORE: ranges from $15,000 for an individual to $100,000 for a Founding membership, along with annual dues of $15,000 for an individual and $18,000 for a couple.

== History ==
The CORE: Club was founded in 2005 by Jennie Enterprise (née Saunders) at 66 East 55th Street in Manhattan, in New York City. Enterprise was the founder of Reebok Sports Clubs before founding the CORE: Club. Enterprise intended CORE: to be a global group of private members' clubs. Upon a meeting with property developer Aby Rosen through a mutual friend, Rosen offered Enterprise seed money and space in a new building on East 55th Street. With that, Enterprise was able to recruit members and raise an additional $10 million. Enterprise then recruited researchers to find potential members before sending them a "marketing kit" with a book called "Good Life: A Prehistory of the Core Club" described by Warren St. James in the New York Times as being "filled with black and white photos of flappers, old America's Cup yachting photos and other images of the Jazz Age ..."

The interior of the club was designed by Stonely Pelsinski Architects Neukomm (SPAN).

The expanded club at 711 Fifth Avenue was designed by m2atelier, opened in September 2023. The club occupies 60,000 square feet of the top four floors of 711 Fifth Avenue with over 6,000 sq ft of outdoor space. The club houses a library, theater, art gallery, several dining rooms, several private meeting rooms, and 11 suites for overnight guests. Services at the club include a wine library, speakeasy, 24-hour gym, medspa, beauty salon and juice bar. The dangene Institute at the CORE: Club offers a service that offers "skinovation" with "noninvasive, nonsurgical kinds of age-optimization, longevity, and just [eliminating] imperfections, generally". dangene was established by Dangene Enterprise (née McKay-Bailey), Jennie's wife. The couple changed their last names to 'Enterprise' upon marriage.

Jennie Enterprise said that the club was "so much more" than a "private club concept," she reimagined the tradition of private communities, moving beyond the old model that relied on rule books and dress codes, and innovating an approach in which freedom, independence and happiness would be the new center of gravity. Enterprise said " ... vision and our goal as an organization is to provide the conditions for transformation" with a " ... hyper-edited collection of people, art, books and ideas - a compelling collage".

An additional location of CORE is scheduled to open in December 2027 on the Corso Giacomo Matteotti in Milan, Italy in a 40,000 square foot palazzo.

Writing for Bloomberg News, James Tarmy described the CORE Club as a "safe berth" for its members on "their endless march" between American Express Centurion Lounges and conference rooms.

== Membership ==
The membership of the CORE Club is drawn from the economic and social elite of New York City. Writing in the New York Times in 2005 Warren St. James described the club as being a place for "a geographically and socially diverse set of wealthy people to gather and meet". Guy Trebay, writing in The New York Times in 2011 felt that the club's members had an "almost cartoonish relationship to conspicuous consumption and the unwavering conviction that Thorstein Veblen had it all wrong". Jennie Enterprise has said that her membership criteria is " ... if somebody has an interesting story to tell, they'd be a great member."

The CORE Club has over 2,000 members globally. The initiation fee for the club was $50,000 in 2018 with a $17,000 annual fee. The 100 founder members were asked to contribute $100,000 and nominate another person. The founder members included J. Christopher Burch, Millard S. Drexler, Ari Emanuel, Patricia Kluge, Aby Rosen, Steven Roth and Stephen A. Schwarzman and Terry Semel. The club has an equal number of female and male members.

Notable members of CORE have included financier Steven A. Cohen, the designer Kenneth Cole, philanthropist Beth Rudin DeWoody, the Commissioner of the National Football League Roger Goodell, businessman James F. McCann, Microsoft executive Nathan Myhrvold, financier Anthony Scaramucci and the Starbucks chairman and CEO Howard Schultz. In 2005 members included gallery owner Marianne Boesky, lawyer and civil rights activist Vernon Jordan, American footballer Dan Marino, tennis player John McEnroe, architect Richard Meier, and musicians Patty Smyth and Roger Waters. Sean Combs launched his cologne at the club with Jay-Z and Nelly. Prince Edward, Earl of Wessex attended a dinner at the club in September 2018.

In a 2011 article on the club for The New York Times, Guy Trebay described the members of the club as "ostensibly younger and possibly hipper but certainly richer and more unashamedly over-the-top than the literati and assorted members of the intelligentsia" that comprise traditional members clubs such as the Century Association, Colony Club, Union Club or Metropolitan clubs. Trebay felt the decor of the club "revels in the shiny aura of the newly arrived" as opposed to the "well-waxed and cigar-scented havens burnished by custom and softened by wear" with "... overstuffed armchairs squared off at the perimeter of Oriental rugs, private humidors and afternoon teas" of the traditional member's clubs of New York's social elite. When CORE Club first opened the art collection was loaned by its members. In 2011 the club displayed pieces by Alexander Calder, Richard Prince, David Salle and Andy Warhol. However, now the club enjoys its own rotating collection of art.
