= Aby Rosen =

German-American real estate developer (born 1960)

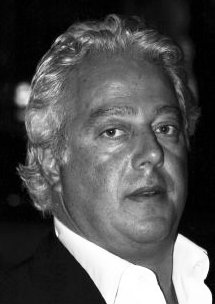
- Rosen in 2007
- Born: May 16, 1960 (age 66); Frankfurt, West Germany
- Education: Wolfgang Goethe University
- Occupation: Real estate investor/developer

Aby Rosen (born May 16, 1960) is a German and American real estate and hospitality tycoon living in New York City. He co-founded RFR Holding, which owns a portfolio of 93 properties valued over $15.5 billion in cities including New York City, Miami, Las Vegas, and Tel Aviv. Highlights include the Seagram Building, W South Beach, The Jaffa Tel Aviv, Gramercy Park Hotel, Paramount Hotel, and Miracle Mile Shops at Planet Hollywood Resort & Casino, among other properties. Rosen is also a member of, a founding investor in, and the landlord of the CORE Club in New York.

Rosen is a noted collector of modern and contemporary art, owning more than 800 postwar pieces, including 100-plus works by Andy Warhol. His collection includes pieces by Jean-Michel Basquiat, Alexander Calder, Damien Hirst, Richard Prince and Jeff Koons.

== Early life ==
Rosen was born in Frankfurt, West Germany, in 1960, the son of Jewish Holocaust survivors. His mother, Anni, spent World War II hiding in a Belgian farmhouse, while his father, Isak, was held in concentration camps in Germany and occupied Poland. After the war, Anni became a painter and Isak a real estate developer. Rosen attended local schools before going to Goethe University Frankfurt, where he graduated with a business degree. His parents moved to Israel by the 1990s, living in Tel Aviv.

== Career ==
In 1987 Rosen moved to New York City. He apprenticed at a real estate brokerage firm selling properties to German investors.

=== Real estate holdings ===
In 1991 he founded the partnership RFR Holding LLC with his childhood friend Michael Fuchs, also a son of Holocaust survivors. The real estate market was in a downturn at the time, but they had access to capital, initially using properties they owned in Germany as collateral. Their strategy was to purchase large, vacant office buildings in need of an upgrade and then refurbish them to high standards. In the 15 years after RFR Holding was established in 1991, Rosen acquired a large portfolio of office buildings, including the Seagram Building, purchased for $375 million from the Teachers Insurance and Annuity Association in 2000, and Lever House.

In 2006 Rosen partnered with Ian Schrager, a longtime friend and co-founder of Studio 54, to transform the 123-year-old Gramercy Park Hotel with minimalist architect John Pawson. In 2014, they put the hotel on the market for $260 million, after completing a four-year, $200 million renovation.

In 2006 Rosen announced plans to develop the site at 610 Lexington Avenue in NYC (directly behind the Seagram Building) into a glass hotel and condominium tower to be designed by Sir Norman Foster.

=== Lever House Art Collection ===
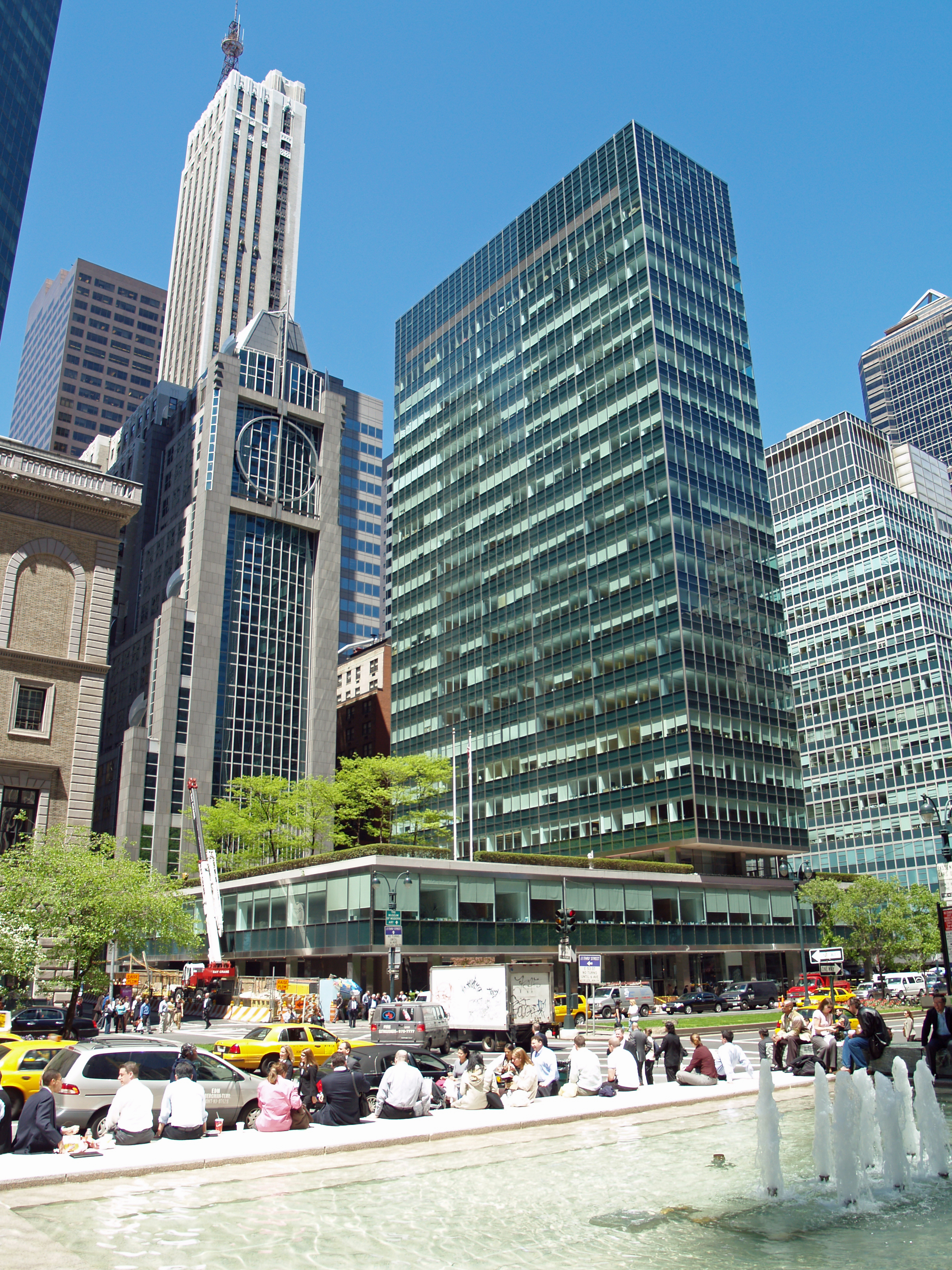
Lever House

The Lever House Art Collection is a collection of works commissioned by Rosen for display at the Lever House. It is curated by Richard Marshall, an art historian and associate curator for the Whitney Museum. The Lever House Art Collection was inaugurated in 2004 featuring a work by Jorge Pardo. Other works have included Bride Fight by E.V. Day, Hulks by Jeff Koons, and Hello Kitty by Tom Sachs.

=== Outside the United States ===
Rosen and Fuchs hold a large real estate portfolio in Germany, especially in Frankfurt. In early 2007, they bought the headquarters building of the European Central Bank. The company also owns the Swift Haus Jungfernstieg in Hamburg.

== Other activities ==
- Phillips, de Pury and Company, Member of the Advisory Board (since 2005).

== Personal life ==
Rosen has been married twice. In 1991, he married Elizabeth Mina Wechsler in a Jewish ceremony at The Pierre in Manhattan. Before their separation in 2000 and divorce in 2004, they had two sons.

In 2005 Rosen married Samantha Boardman, a psychiatrist and socialite. She converted to Judaism. They have two children.

=== Personal residences ===
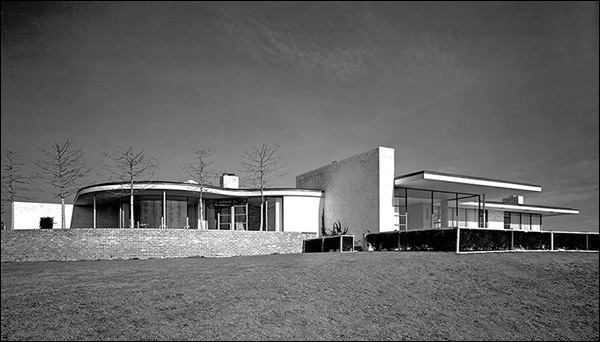
Rosen's 1938 Goodyear House in Old Westbury, New York

Rosen resides on the Upper East Side of Manhattan with his wife and their two children. The family summers in Southampton, New York, where they have a $21.5 million home.

In 2011 Rosen bought the A. Conger Goodyear House in Old Westbury, New York on Long Island for $3.4 million. The house was designed and built in 1938 by Edward Durell Stone in the International Style for Anson Conger Goodyear, the first president of the Museum of Modern Art. Rosen completed a several-year renovation of the property. He keeps many of his important pieces of art there, including The Virgin Mother, a 13-ton, 33-foot-high bronze sculpture by Damien Hirst of a pregnant woman with peeled skin and an exposed fetus.

Rosen is reported to own a $36 million vacation home in Saint Barthélemy.

Rosen holds an annual dinner party at the W South Beach during Art Basel, attended by a mix of celebrities and business leaders.
