= Private members' club =

Social venue

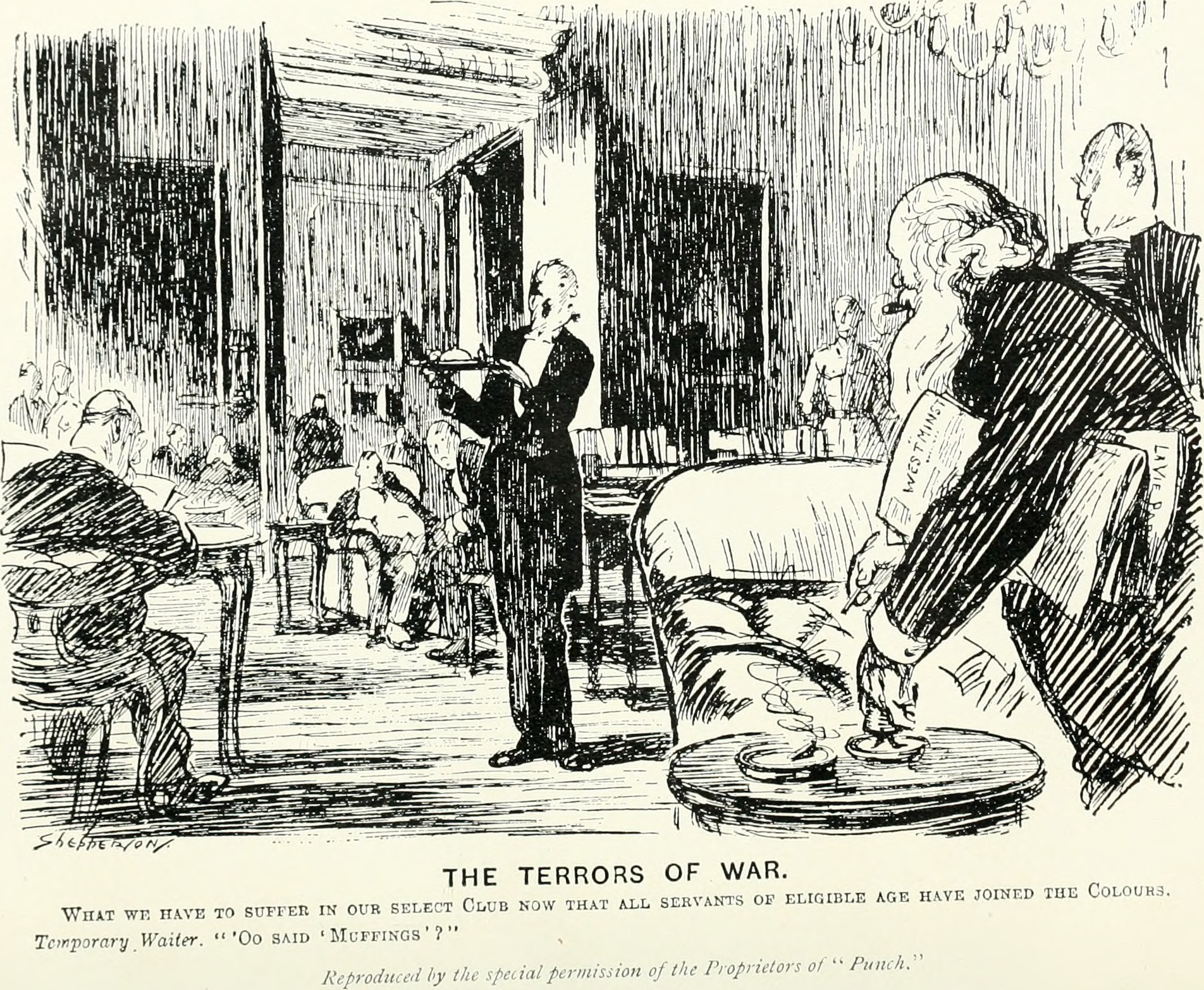
1920 cartoon of The Arts Club, a private members' club founded in London by Charles Dickens

Private members' clubs are organisations which provide social and other facilities to members who typically pay a membership fee for access and use. Most are owned and controlled by their members even to this day. Some were originally gentlemen's clubs to which members first had to be elected; others are more modern commercial establishments with no class or gender bar, typically offering food, drink, comfortable surroundings, venue hire and business facilities, in return for members paying subscription or membership fees.

== History ==
The first gentlemen's clubs, mostly established in the West End of London from the late 17th century onwards, were highly exclusive, offering aristocratic and wealthy men a refuge from work and family. The eligibility of potential members depended on their class and gender, with women banned from joining any of them. Early clubs also provided an environment for gambling, illegal outside of members-only establishments. Individuals needed to be formally proposed for membership, and candidates were subject to election by committees which scrutinised individuals' character and suitability.

Several private members' clubs for women were established in the late 19th century; among them the Alexandra Club, the Ladies' Institute, the Ladies' Athenaeum and the University Women's Club. Many of the traditional gentlemen's clubs now allow women as members, though a few, including - until May 2024 - the Garrick Club in London's Covent Garden, still refuse women membership.

More modern but otherwise similar private members' clubs have since been established. Most of these, however, are for-profit commercial enterprises neither owned nor controlled by members. London examples include the Groucho Club (established in 1985), Soho House (1995) and Home House (1998); similar clubs operate in other cities and countries: for example, the CORE Club was established in New York City in 2005. These typically offer memberships by subscription and are owned and run as commercial concerns. They offer similar facilities such as food, drink, comfortable surroundings, venue hire and in many cases accommodation. Mobile working (using phone and email) had put pressure on traditional London clubs, some of which discouraged use of mobiles and laptops, or discussion of business matters. By contrast, business-oriented private members' clubs combine the style, food and drink of a contemporary private members' club with the business facilities of a serviced office or coworking space.

== Examples ==
Notable examples of private members' clubs include:

- Annabel's, London
- Athenaeum Club, Melbourne
- Australian Club, Sydney
- Brook's, London
- Carlton Club, London
- Garrick Club, London
- Harvard Club, New York City
- Hong Kong Club, Hong Kong
- Knickerbocker Club, New York City
- Melbourne Club, Melbourne
- Pitt Club, Cambridge
- Reform Club, London
- Tanglin Club, Singapore
- Travellers Club, London
- White's, London
- 5 Hertford Street, London

== See also ==
- List of members' clubs in London
- List of American gentlemen's clubs
- List of India's gentlemen's clubs
