= A&P Warehouse =

Residential building in Manhattan, New York

67 Vestry Street
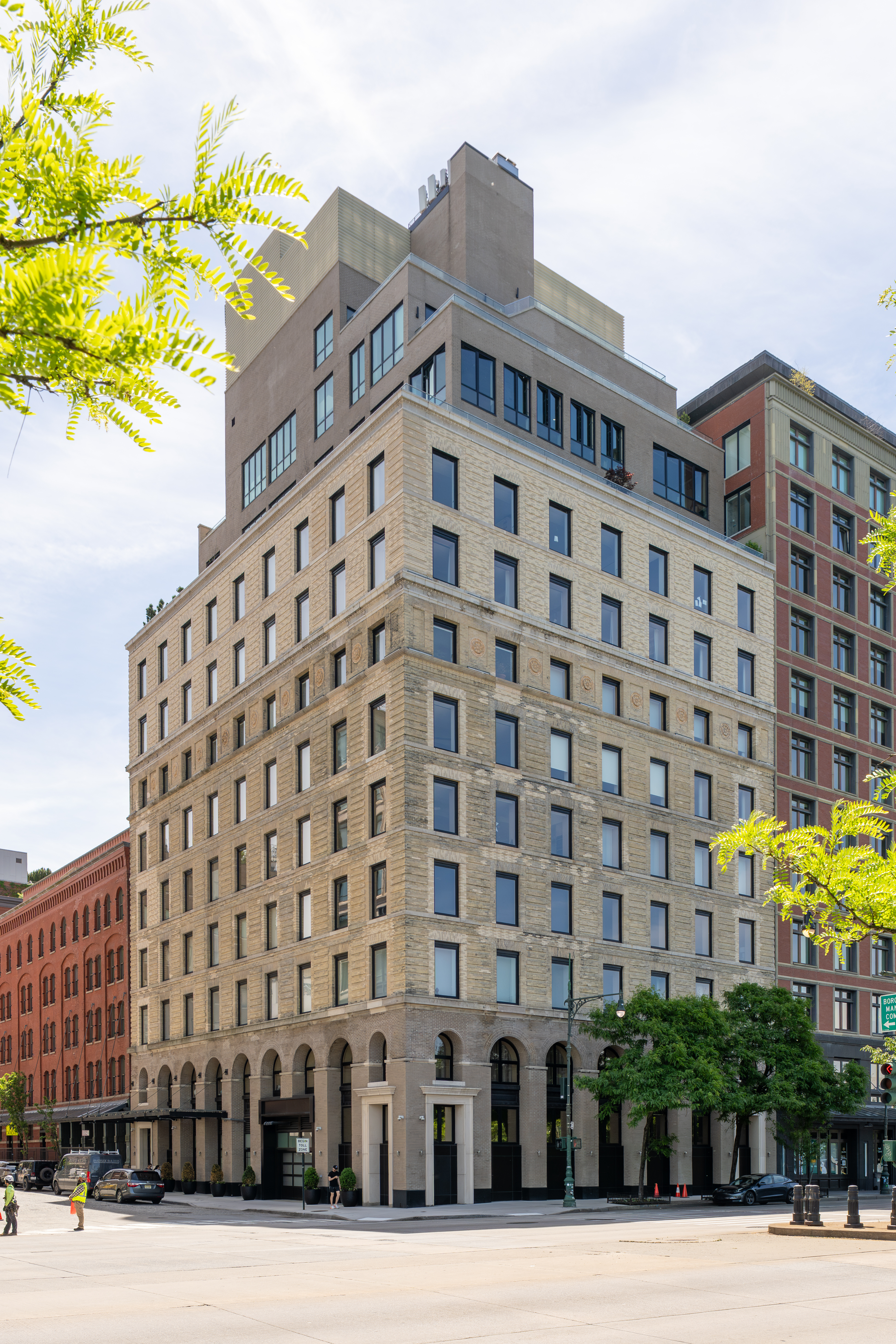
- (2026)
- Former names: The Great Atlantic & Pacific Tea Company warehouse
- Alternative names: A&P Warehouse

General information
- Status: Completed
- Type: Low-rise building
- Architectural style: Romanesque Revival
- Classification: Residential
- Location: Tribeca, 67 Vestry Street, Manhattan, New York, United States
- Coordinates: 40.722744°N 74.011207°W
- Named for: Great Atlantic & Pacific Tea Co.
- Construction started: 1896
- Completed: 1899
- Renovated: 1910
- Owner: Aby Rosen

Height
- Height: 99.68 feet (30.38 m)

Technical details
- Floor count: 9

Design and construction
- Architect: Frederick P. Dinkelberg
- Architecture firm: Burnham and Root
- Designations: Pending

Other information
- Parking: Street

The Great Atlantic and Pacific Tea Company (A&P) Warehouse, located at 67 Vestry Street, is a historic building in the Tribeca section of Lower Manhattan in New York City. Originally a storage building, it was later converted to residential use and has since been historically linked to the New York City arts scene.

== History ==
The A&P Warehouse, built for the Great Atlantic & Pacific Tea Company grocery chain, was completed in 1897 and features a fortress-like Romanesque Revival facade. Designed by architect Frederick P. Dinkelberg as a seven-story storage building, two additional stories and an extension were eventually added. This renovation, completed in 1910, was designed by architect Frank Helme.

Many historic buildings around the A&P Warehouse, including the original A&P storefront at 31 Vesey Street, were destroyed by government-led mid-20th Century urban renewal projects. After A&P moved across the Hudson River to Jersey City, New Jersey, the warehouse was converted to loft apartments. By the 1970s artists had set up homes and studios within the lofts. Several famous 20th-Century artists, most notably Marisol, Andy Warhol, John Chamberlain, Wim Wenders and Robert Wilson, have called the former A&P Warehouse home.

In 2014, developer Aby Rosen, 67 Vestry Street's current owner, announced that he would like to replace the structure with a 11-story residential tower. Current residents and local preservationists have formed a movement to bring landmark status to the structure to stop its demolition.

== See also ==
- Great Atlantic and Pacific Tea Company Warehouse (Jersey City, New Jersey) (successor A&P Warehouse)
- A & P Food Stores Building (another A&P company structure)
