= Aminopurine =

Aminopurine (AP) may refer to:

- 2-Aminopurine
- 6-Aminopurine (adenine)
