= E.V. Day =

American sculptor

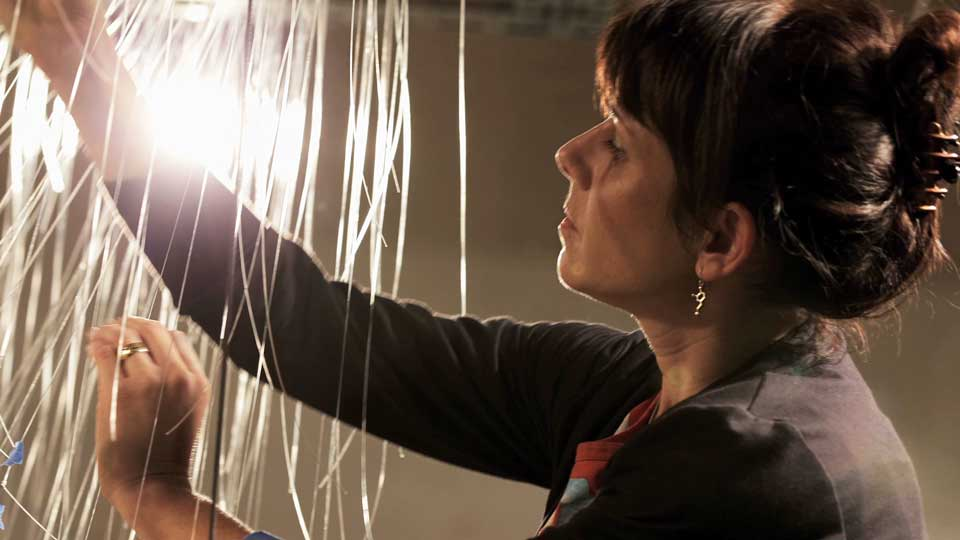
- Born: December 9, 1967 (age 58); New York, US
- Education: Hampshire College (BA); Yale University (MFA)
- Website: Official website

E.V. Day (born 1967, New York) is an American, New York-based installation artist and sculptor. Day's work explores themes of feminism and sexuality, while employing various suspension techniques and reflecting upon popular culture. She is known for site specific installations in notable institutions including the New York City Opera at Lincoln Center, Philip Johnson's Glass House, the Whitney Museum of American Art at Altria, and the Lever House.

== Education ==
Day studied at the Berkshire School before receiving her BA from Hampshire College. She received her MFA in Sculpture from Yale School of Art in 1995.

== Work ==
In the year 2000, E.V. Day was featured in the Whitney Biennial with her suspended sculpture "Bombshell," which now resides in the museum's permanent collection. That same year she had a solo exhibition, her first in New York, titled "Transporter" at Henry Urbach Architecture. In Roberta Smith's review of the show for the New York Times, she describes the show as "a darkened, spotlighted installation centering on a shimmering silver-sequined evening gown. Here the garment ... doesn't so much explode as transform itself. ... perhaps it is being ''beamed up,'' as its title suggests, remanded to the sky, like some mythological heroine, there to become a constellation."

In 2001 she had a solo exhibition at the Whitney Museum at Altria called “G-Force” for which Day suspended hundreds of resin-coated thongs from the ceiling in fighter-jet formations.

In 2002 "Bombshell" was included as part of Moon River at the Wexner Center for the Arts in Columbus, Ohio. The following year, three new works within Day's Exploding Couture series collectively titled "The Sanguine Sisters" were exhibited for the first time at the Barbican Centre in London as part of the exhibit "Rapture: Art's Seduction by Fashion 1970-2002".

In 2003 she returned to Henry Urbach Architecture with a solo show titled "Galaxy." For the Brooklyn Rail, Megan Heuer describes included works such as "G-Spot Gestation" and "Jock String Integration" as "red and white thongs ... calcified in a clear gooey plastic, hardened into astronomical forms" and situates "Red Streak" as "hang[ing] on the tension between movement and stillness, freedom and capture, science fiction and romance."

In 2004, the Herbert F. Johnson Museum of Art at Cornell University mounted a ten-year survey of her work.

In 2006, at Lever House, Day exhibited “Bride Fight”, a site-specific installation of two bridal gowns in mid-explosion. “Bride Fight” resides in the Lever House permanent collection. Deitch Projects Archive describes the work: "Using heavy-duty fishing line and hardware, E.V. Day eviscerated the two white gowns along with their accompanying tulle veils, long lace gloves, garters, shoes and, even, strands of hair. A white glove grasped a fistful of blonde braid; another simultaneously burst a string of pearls around the other’s neck. Frozen in the extreme of distention, the materials were captured in a thicket of hundreds of monofilaments at their moment of obliteration." A scale model of "Bride Fight" was later shown as part of the Peabody Essex Museum's "Wedded Bliss: The Marriage of Art and Ceremony" exhibition in 2008.

That same year, Day had a solo exhibition of 3-D drawings in black light at the Santa Barbara Contemporary Arts Forum titled “Intergalactic Installations.” Later that year she exhibited a sound installation in the Boiler Room at MoMA PS1 titled "Sweet Heat," featuring "speakers throughout the room that emit the sounds of cats purring, ... bring[ing] the space to life with feline activity."

In 2008, the Whitney Museum commissioned Day to create “Bondage/Bandage” from a bandage dress by Hervé Léger.

In 2009, New York City Opera commissioned her to create “Divas Ascending” at Lincoln Center from their vast wardrobe archive.

In 2010, she was awarded the Versailles Foundation Munn Artists Program residency at Claude Monet’s Garden in Giverny, France resulting in two solo shows. “Seducers” at Carolina Nitsch Contemporary Gallery, where she presented high-resolution scans of the reproductive organs of flowers, and at The Hole Gallery, where a recreation of Monet’s Garden was installed with living plants and a lily pond and photographs were displayed that Day made of punk legend Kembra Pfahler as her character The Voluptuous Horror of Karen Black commandeering the tranquility of Monet’s Garden.

In 2011, she was invited to the International Artist-In-Residence Program at Artpace, the Linda Pace Foundation in San Antonio, Texas where she was commissioned to make the suspended sculpture “CatFight.” The sculpture features two saber-toothed cat skeletons engaged in battle. “CatFight” was then exhibited at Mary Boone Gallery in her 2014 solo show called “Semi-Feral.”

In 2013, at Philip Johnson’s Glass House Estate, in New Canaan, CT, she was commissioned to create a site specific installation and exhibition called “SNAP!,” that featured heavyweight red rope nets enveloping and ensnaring the iconic “Da Monsta” building to the ground. The interior, titled “Quadrophonic Purr Chamber,” continued the rope motif with taut cords accentuating the asymmetrical, vertigo-inducing, interior space which was amplified with the sound of cat purring.

In 2016, E.V. Day was commissioned by NASCAR legend Jimmie Johnson to create a sculpture using the fire suit he wore during his first Daytona 500 win in 2006. The resulting suspension sculpture "Daytona Vortex" was exhibited at The Mint Museum in Charlotte, North Carolina, in 2021.

In 2016, Day was awarded a Rome Prize fellowship at the American Academy in Rome, culminating in an exhibition of her work, a suspended sculpture called “Golden Rays/In-Vitro.” The work was inspired by Bernini’s Ecstasy of Saint Teresa altarpiece and used gold-leafed aircraft cable referencing the raggi and golden rays depicted in annunciation painting and sculpture of the Italian baroque period. In 2024, J. Paul Getty Museum commissioned a new iteration of the work for the exhibition "Lumen: The Art and Science of Light.” which was part of the Los Angeles PST ART: Art & Science Collide city-wide exhibitions.

In 2024 Day presented her first solo show of entirely two-dimensional work, "Velocity Drawings & My Crazy Sunshine,” at Baldwin Gallery in Aspen, CO.

== Awards ==
- 2016 Rome Prize in Visual Arts from The American Academy in Rome, Italy for the 2016-2017 fellow.
- 2011 Artpace Residency by the Linda Pace Foundation in San Antonio, Texas.
- 2010 Versailles Foundation Munn Artists program at Claude Monet's Garden in Giverny, France.
- 2007 Fellowship in Sculpture from the New York Foundation for the Arts.
- 1995 Susan H. Whedon Award for Outstanding Student in Sculpture from the Yale University School of Art.

== Collections ==
E.V. Day is in numerous permanent collections including:

- The Metropolitan Museum of Art
- Museum of Modern Art
- San Francisco Museum of Modern Art
- Whitney Museum
- The Lever House Art Collection
- The New York Public Library
- Yale University Art Gallery
- National Air and Space Museum
- Herbert F. Johnson Museum of Art
- Eli and Edythe Broad Art Museum
- Denver Art Museum
