= Hungarian adópengő =

Unit of currency

adópengő (Hungarian)
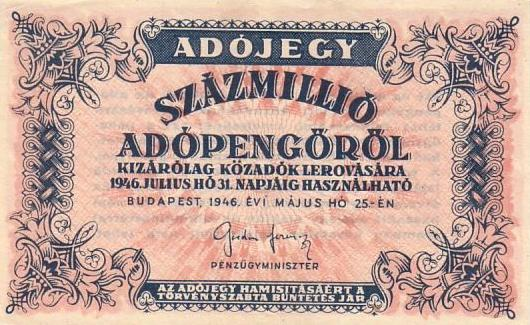
100 million adópengő (tax bill)
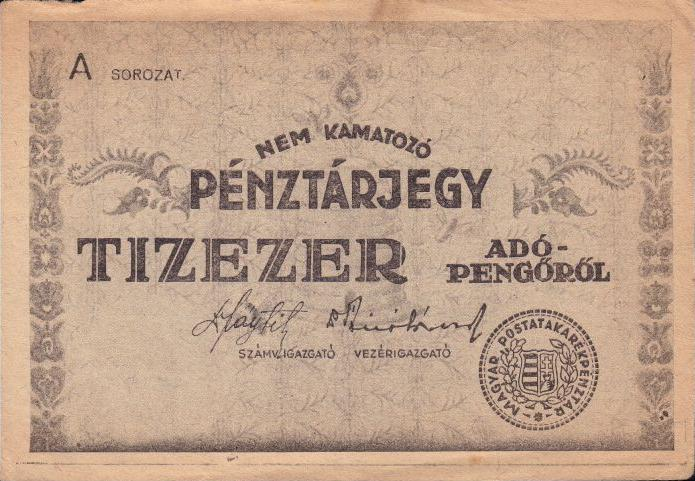
10 000 adópengő (savings certificate)

Unit
- Symbol: AP

Denominations
- Banknotes: 10,000, 50,000, 100,000, 500,000, 1 million, 10 million, 100 million adópengő

Demographics
- User(s): Kingdom of Hungary; Republic of Hungary

Issuance
- Central bank: Hungarian State Treasury; Hungarian Postal Savings Bank; Hungarian National Bank
- Website: www.mnb.hu
- Printer: Hungarian Banknote Printing Corp.
- Website: www.penzjegynyomda.hu

Valuation
- Inflation: 3.572·10^{9}%
- This infobox shows the latest status before this currency was rendered obsolete.

The adópengő ('tax pengő') was a temporary unit of currency of Hungary between 1 January 1946, when it was introduced to try to stabilise the pengő, and 31 July 1946, when both were replaced by the forint. Initially, the adópengő was only an accounting unit used by the government and commercial banks; later, bonds and savings certificates denominated in adópengő were also issued for the public and replaced pengő notes in circulation.

== Statistics ==
Adópengő index, 1946 (pengős per adópengő)
Date	Index number
1 January	1
1 February	1.7
1 March	10
1 April	44
1 May	630
1 June	160,000
1 July	7,500,000,000 (7.5×10^{9})
31 July	2,000,000,000,000,000,000,000 (2×10^{21}, 2 sextillion, or 2,000 billion billion)

Adópengő
Preceded by: Hungarian pengő Reason: to create a numerical basis for budget calculations Ratio: at par	Currency of Hungary; 1 January 1946 – 31 July 1946; Concurrent with: pengő	Circulates in Hungary; 1 August 1946 – 30 September 1946; Concurrent with: forint	Succeeded by: Hungarian forint Reason: Hyperinflation; Ratio: 1 forint = 2×10^{8} adópengő
