= Great Atlantic and Pacific Tea Company Warehouse (Buffalo, New York) =

- The Great Atlantic and Pacific Tea Company Warehouse
- U.S. National Register of Historic Places
- New York State Register of Historic Places
- The Great Atlantic and Pacific Tea Company Warehouse, September 2019

- Location within New York Location within the United States
- Location: 545 Swan Street, Buffalo, New York
- Coordinates: 42°52′41″N 78°51′27″W
- Area: 1.2 acres (0.49 ha)
- Built: 1917, 1918, 1939
- Built by: John W. Cowper Company
- MPS: Historic Resources of the Hydraulics/Larkin Neighborhood
- NRHP reference No.: 15000819
- NYSRHP No.: 02940.027789

Significant dates
- Added to NRHP: January 5, 2016
- Designated NYSRHP: October 1, 2015

The Great Atlantic and Pacific Tea Company Warehouse, also known as the A&P Warehouse and The Keystone Warehouse Company, is a historic warehouse building located in Buffalo, Erie County, New York. It was built in 1917, and is an eight-story reinforced concrete industrial building encompassing 250,000 square feet of warehouse space. It has a one-story wing built of concrete block walls and steel framing. The building was occupied by The Great Atlantic & Pacific Tea Company until 1975.

The building is currently undergoing conversion and rehabilitation into loft residential units. It was listed on the National Register of Historic Places in 2016.

== Gallery ==
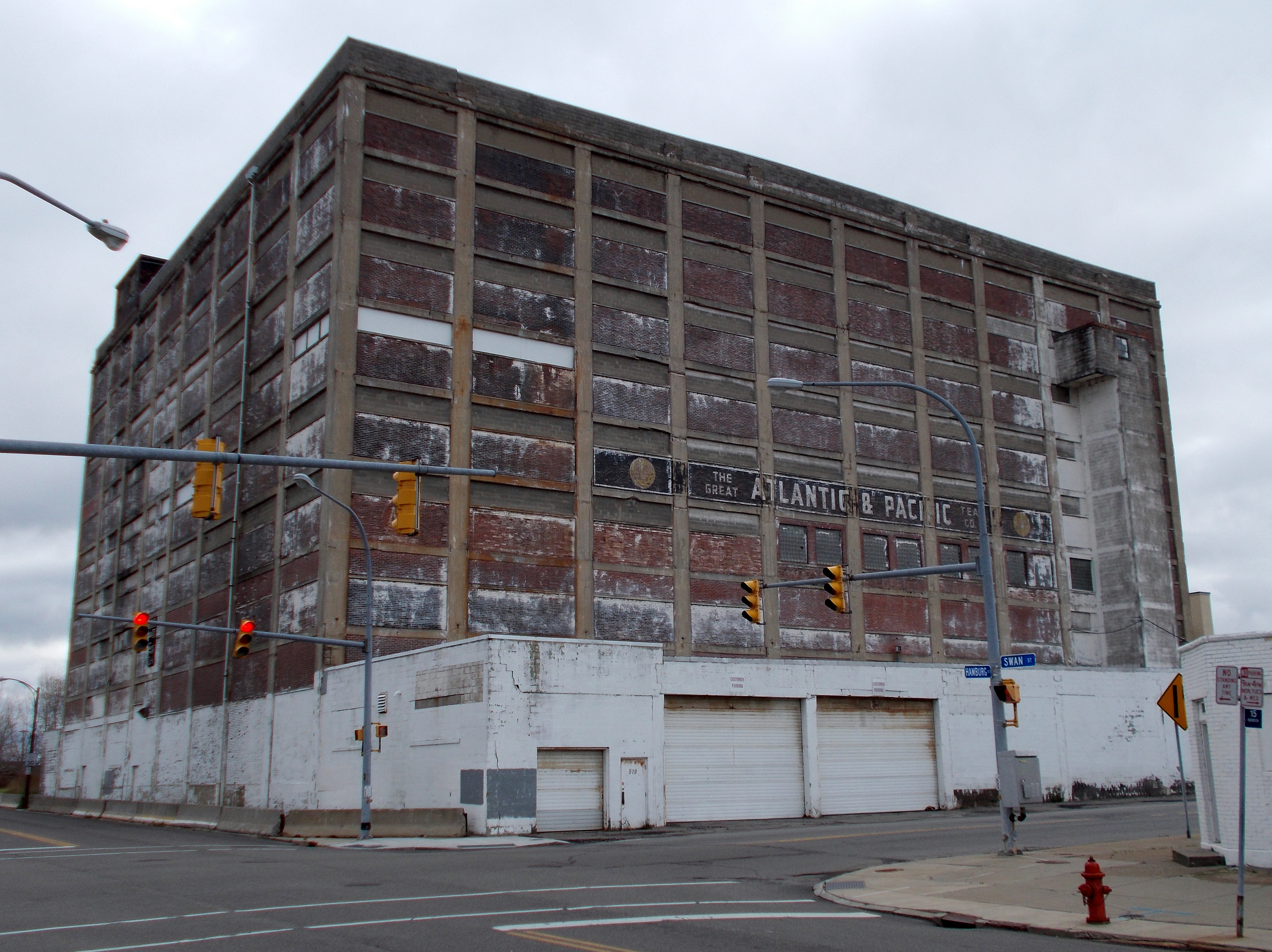
The Great Atlantic and Pacific Tea Company Warehouse, November 2015
