= Acción Popular =

Acción Popular may refer to:

- Popular Action (El Salvador), a political party in El Salvador
- Popular Action (Peru), a centrist and social liberal party
- Popular Action (Spain), Spanish Roman Catholic political party from 1931 to 1937
