= Hungarian forint =

Currency of Hungary

magyar forint (Hungarian)
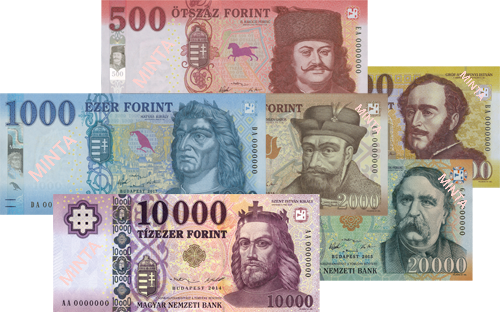
- Hungarian forint banknotes

ISO 4217
- Code: HUF (numeric: 348)
- Subunit: 0.01

Unit
- Plural: forintok (nominative only)
- Symbol: Ft

Denominations
- Subunit
- –: None (since 1999)
- 1/100: fillér (before 1999)
- Banknotes: 500 Ft, 1,000 Ft, 2,000 Ft, 5,000 Ft, 10,000 Ft, 20,000 Ft,
- Coins
- Freq. used: 5 Ft, 10 Ft, 20 Ft, 50 Ft, 100 Ft, 200 Ft

Demographics
- Date of introduction: 1 August 1946
- Replaced: Hungarian adópengő
- User(s): Hungary

Issuance
- Central bank: Hungarian National Bank
- Website: mnb.hu
- Printer: Hungarian Banknote Printing Company
- Website: penzjegynyomda.hu
- Mint: Hungarian Mint
- Website: penzvero.hu

Valuation
- Inflation: 3.7% (2024)
- Source: ksh.hu
- Method: CPI

The forint (Note: Hungarian pronunciation: [ˈforint]) (sign Ft; code HUF) is the currency of Hungary. It was formerly divided into 100 fillér, but fillér coins are no longer in circulation. The introduction of the forint on 1 August 1946 was a crucial step in the post-World War II stabilisation of the Hungarian economy, and the currency remained relatively stable until the 1980s. Transition to a market economy in the early 1990s adversely affected the value of the forint; inflation peaked at 35% in 1991. Between 2001 and 2022, inflation was in single digits, and the forint has been declared fully convertible. In May 2022, inflation reached 10.7% amid the Russian invasion of Ukraine and economic uncertainty. As a member of the European Union, the long-term aim of the Hungarian government may be to replace the forint with the euro, although under the Orbán governments there was no target date for adopting the euro.

== History ==
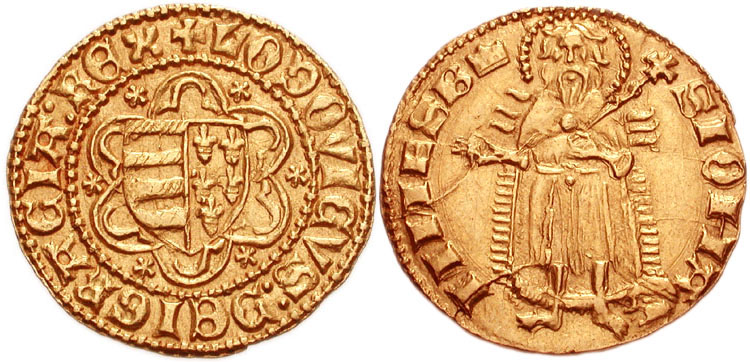
Forint of Louis I of Hungary (1342–1382). Reverse: LODOVICVS DEI GRACIA REX. Obverse: S[ANCTVS] IOHANNES B[APTISTA].

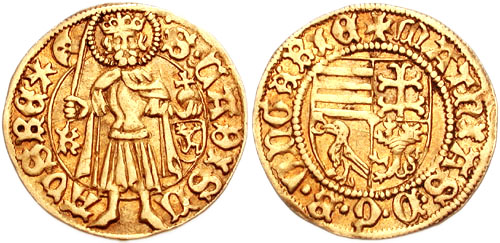
Forint of Matthias Corvinus of Hungary (1458–1490). Obverse: S[ANCTVS] LADISLAVS REX. Reverse: MATHIAS D[EI] G[RATIA] R[EX] VNGARIE.

The forint's name comes from the Italian city of Florence, where gold coins called fiorino d'oro were minted from 1252. In Hungary, the florentinus (later forint), also a gold-based currency, was used from 1325 under Charles Robert, with several other countries following Hungary's example.

Between 1868 and 1892, the forint was the name used in Hungarian for the currency of the Austro-Hungarian Empire, known in German as the Gulden. It was subdivided into 100 krajczár (krajcár in modern Hungarian orthography; cf German Kreuzer).

The forint was reintroduced on 1 August 1946, after the pengő was rendered worthless in 1945–46 by the most severe hyperinflation ever recorded. This was brought about by a mixture of the high demand for reparations from the USSR, Soviet plundering of Hungarian industries, and the holding of Hungary's gold reserves in the United States. The different parties in the government had different plans to solve this problem. To the Independent Smallholders' Party–which had won a large majority in the 1945 Hungarian parliamentary election–as well as the Social Democrats, outside support was essential. However, the Soviet Union and its local supporters in the Hungarian Communist Party were opposed to raising loans in the West, and thus the Communist Party masterminded the procedure using exclusively domestic resources. The Communist plan called for tight limits on personal spending, as well as the concentration of existing stocks in state hands.

When the forint was introduced, its value was defined on the basis of 1 kilogram of fine gold being 13,210 Ft (or 1 Ft = 75.7 mg fine gold). Therefore, given that gold was fixed at £8 8s sterling (£8.40 in modern decimal notation) per troy ounce, one pound sterling was at that time worth about 49 forints. When the forint was introduced, it dropped 29 zeroes from the value of the pengő. As a measure of how badly inflated the pengő was, total value of pengő notes in circulation at the time was now equivalent to less than 0.2 fillér.

== Coins ==
In 1946, coins were introduced in denominations of 2, 10, 20 fillérs and 1, 2, 5 forints. The silver 5 forint coin was reissued only in the next year; later it was withdrawn from circulation. Five and 50 fillérs coins were issued in 1948. In 1967, a 5 forint coin was reintroduced, followed by a 10 forint in 1971 and 20 forint in 1982.

In 1992, a new series of coins was introduced in denominations of 1, 2, 5, 10, 20, 50, 100 and (a somewhat different, 500‰ silver) 200 forint. Production of the 2 and 5 fillér coins ceased in 1992, with all fillér coins withdrawn from circulation by 1999. From 1996, a bicolor 100 forint coin was minted to replace the 1992 version, since the latter was considered too big and ugly, and could easily be mistaken for the 20 forint coin.

Silver 200 forint coins were withdrawn in 1998 (as their nominal value was too low compared to their precious metal content); the 1 and 2 forint coins remained legal tender until 29 February 2008. For cash purchases, the total price is now rounded to the nearest multiple of 5 forint (to 0 or to 5). A new 200 forint coin made of base metal alloy was introduced in place of the 200 forint banknote on 15 June 2009.

== Banknotes ==
In 1946, 10 and 100 forint notes were introduced by the Hungarian National Bank. A new series of higher quality banknotes (in denominations of 10, 20 and 100 forints) were introduced in 1947 and 1948. 50 forint notes were added in 1953, 500 forint notes were introduced in 1970, followed by 1,000 forints in 1983, and 5,000 forints in 1991.

A completely redesigned new series of banknotes in denominations of 200, 500, 1,000, 2,000, 5,000, 10,000 and 20,000 forints was introduced gradually between 1997 and 2001. Each banknote depicts a famous Hungarian leader or politician on the obverse and a place or event related to him on the reverse. All of the banknotes are watermarked, contain an embedded vertical security strip, an invisible ink design and are suitable for visually impaired people. The 1,000 forints and higher denominations are protected by an interwoven holographic security strip. The notes share the common size of 154 mm × 70 mm (6.1 in × 2.8 in). The banknotes are printed by the Hungarian Banknote Printing Corp. in Budapest on paper manufactured by the Diósgyőr Papermill in Miskolc.

Commemorative banknotes have also been issued: 1,000 and 2,000 forint notes to commemorate the millennium (in 2000) and a 500-forint note to commemorate the 50th anniversary of the 1956 revolution (in 2006).

The 200-forint banknote was withdrawn from circulation in 2009, as its value inflated over time. Also due to the embarrassment caused by the fact that the model of the portrait on the banknote, purported to be of King Charles Robert (of whom no authentic contemporary depictions survived), turned out to be of an acquaintance of the designer, the managing director of the security company that supplied the banknote printing company. The banknote was replaced by a bimetallic 200-forint coin featuring the iconic Széchenyi Chain Bridge.

Forgery of forint banknotes is not significant. However, forged 20,000 forint notes printed on the paper of 2,000 forint notes after dissolving the original ink might come up and are not easy to recognize. Another denomination preferred by counterfeiters was the 1,000 forint note until improved security features were added in 2006.

Worn banknotes no longer fit for circulation are withdrawn, destroyed and turned into briquettes which are donated to public benefit (charitable) organizations to be used as heating fuel.

In 2014, a new revised version of the 1997 banknote series was gradually put into circulation beginning with the 10,000 Ft banknote in 2014 and completed with the 500 Ft banknote in 2019.

In 2022 after Russia's invasion of Ukraine, the EUR-HUF exchange rate breached the 400 forints per 1 euro line for the first time, but rates at that level or higher lasted until the end of 2022. Some time later, the forint also depreciated against the US dollar, breaching the same line. The forint is still more than 400 forints per 1 euro in May 2025. Against the US dollar the forint strengthened more markedly, returning to levels below 400 in November 2022 and below 350 in April 2023.

== Current exchange rates ==
Current HUF exchange rates
From Google Finance:	AUD CAD CHF CNY EUR GBP HKD JPY USD TRY
From Yahoo! Finance:	AUD CAD CHF CNY EUR GBP HKD JPY USD TRY
From XE.com:	AUD CAD CHF CNY EUR GBP HKD JPY USD TRY
From OANDA:	AUD CAD CHF CNY EUR GBP HKD JPY USD TRY

=== Historic rates ===
Forints per dollar, euro, etc.

Most traded currencies (from 31 December 1990):

Year	(United States) USD	(Europe) EUR	(Germany) DEM	(United Kingdom) GBP	(Switzerland) CHF	(Japan) JPY
1990	61.45	84.06	40.47	116.58	47.41	0.4524
1991	75.62	100.84	49.83	141.48	55.85	0.6035
1992	83.97	101.10	51.96	127.03	57.61	0.6732
1993	100.70	112.03	58.06	148.90	68.11	0.9022
1994	110.69	135.77	71.47	173.11	84.46	1.1105
1995	139.47	178.45	97.38	215.40	121.19	1.3539
1996	164.93	206.90	106.17	280.30	122.22	1.4174
1997	203.50	223.44	113.59	337.22	139.82	1.5650
1998	219.03	257.12	130.65	362.30	158.94	1.9242
1999	252.52	254.92	130.34	408.30	158.85	2.4706
2000	284.73	264.94	135.46	425.47	173.92	2.4770
2001	279.03	246.33	125.95	404.15	166.23	2.1251
2002	225.16	235.90	120.61	362.67	162.37	1.8966
2003	207.92	262.23	134.08	370.66	168.30	1.9443
2004	180.29	245.93	125.74	347.83	159.34	1.7584
2005	213.58	252.73	129.22	368.40	162.33	1.8200
2006	191.62	252.30	129.00	375.77	156.99	1.6111
2007	172.61	253.35	129.54	344.84	152.42	1.5244
2008	187.91	264.78	135.38	272.36	177.78	2.0823
2009	188.07	270.84	138.48	303.17	182.34	2.0363
2010	208.65	278.75	142.52	323.37	222.68	2.5652
2011	240.68	311.13	159.08	371.15	255.91	3.1051
2012	220.93	291.29	148.93	355.39	241.06	2.5696
2013	215.67	296.91	151.81	356.76	242.14	2.0542
2014	259.13	314.89	161.00	403.75	261.85	2.1686
2015	286.63	313.12	160.10	424.96	289.38	2.3812
2016	293.69	311.02	159.02	361.62	289.41	2.5134
2017	258.82	310.14	158.57	349.48	265.24	2.2984
2018	280.94	321.51	164.38	355.25	285.16	2.5454
2019	294.74	330.52	168.99	387.82	304.39	2.7137
2020	297.36	365.13	186.68	406.16	337.41	2.8864
2021	325.71	369.00	188.66	440.03	356.90	2.8293
2022	375.68	400.25	204.64	451.98	406.93	2.8437
2023	346.44	382.78	195.70	440.19	412.28	2.4414
2024	393.60	410.09	209.69	494.16	435.45	2.5126
2025	328.42	385.40	197.04	441.33	413.89	2.0967

Sources: arfolyam.iridium.hu

Currencies of nearby countries (from 31 December 2010):

Year	(Poland) PLN	(Czech Republic) CZK	(Romania) RON	(Bulgaria) BGN	(Croatia) HRK	(Serbia) RSD	(Russia) RUB	(Turkey) TRY
2010	70.40	11.12	65.07	142.54	37.75	2.62	6.83	135.33
2011	70.51	12.05	72.07	159.06	41.27	2.96	7.47	125.57
2012	71.50	11.62	65.71	148.93	38.59	2.56	7.26	123.29
2013	71.60	10.84	66.29	151.81	38.94	2.59	6.55	101.10
2014	73.88	11.35	70.23	161.00	41.13	2.60	4.45	111.36
2015	73.46	11.58	69.22	160.10	40.98	2.58	3.88	97.86
2016	70.29	11.51	68.53	159.02	41.13	2.52	4.78	83.29
2017	74.35	12.13	66.57	158.57	41.59	2.62	4.49	68.68
2018	74.82	12.47	69.01	164.39	43.38	2.72	4.05	53.31
2019	77.50	13.01	69.08	168.99	44.42	2.81	4.74	49.57
2020	79.29	13.87	74.99	186.68	48.35	3.11	3.96	39.70
2021	80.30	14.84	74.56	188.66	49.10	3.14	4.35	24.30
2022	85.35	16.58	80.88	204.64	53.11	3.41	5.15	20.07
2023	88.04	15.48	76.95	195.71	50.80	3.27	3.86	11.72
2024	95.97	16.30	82.42	209.67	54.43	3.51	3.66	11.13
2025	91.18	15.92	75.61	197.04	51.15	3.29	4.12	7.64

Sources: arfolyam.iridium.hu

The cost of one Euro in forints (from 1999)

== See also ==
- Economy of Hungary
- Hungary and the euro
- List of currencies in Europe

Preceded by: Hungarian pengő Reason: hyperinflation Ratio: 1 forint = 4×10^{29} pengő (theoretically)	Currency of Hungary; 1 August 1946 – Concurrent with: adópengő until 30 September 1946	Succeeded by: Current
Preceded by: Hungarian adópengő Reason: hyperinflation Ratio: 1 forint = 200,000,000 adópengő	Currency of Hungary; 1 August 1946 – Concurrent with: adópengő until 30 September 1946	Succeeded by: Current
