= Great Atlantic and Pacific Tea Company Warehouse (Jersey City, New Jersey) =

Mixed-use building in New Jersey, US

- U.S. National Register of Historic Places
- U.S. National Historic Landmark
- New Jersey Register of Historic Places
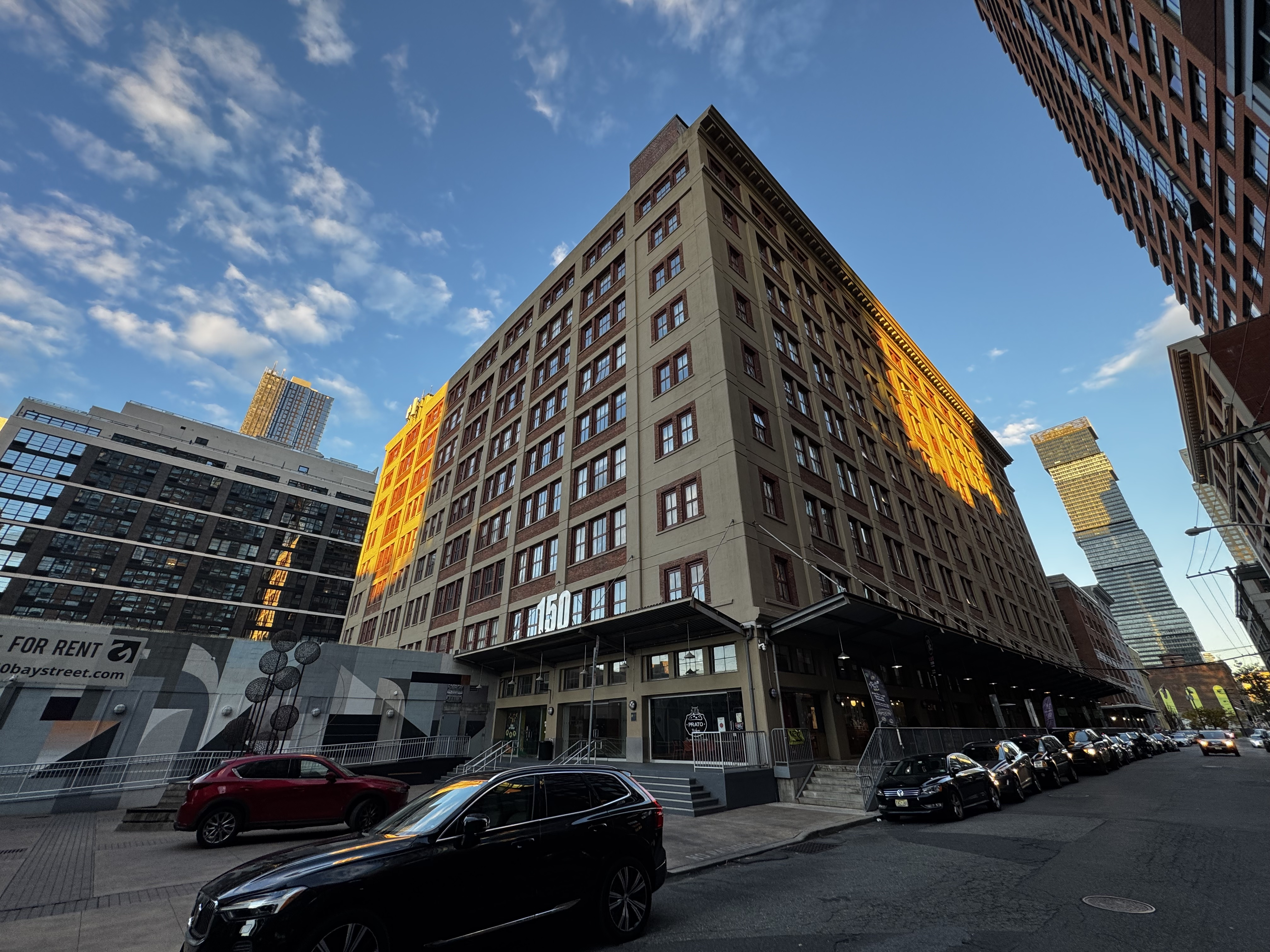

- Location within Hudson County, New Jersey Location within New Jersey Location within the United States
- Location: 150 Bay Street, Jersey City, New Jersey
- Coordinates: 40°43′15.67″N 74°2′24.84″W
- Area: 1.5 acres (0.61 ha)
- Built: 1900
- Architect: Turner Construction Company
- NRHP reference No.: 78001766
- NJRHP No.: 1504

Significant dates
- Added to NRHP: June 2, 1978
- Designated NHL: June 2, 1978
- Designated NJRHP: June 2, 1978

The Great Atlantic and Pacific Tea Company Warehouse is a historic formerly commercial building at 150 Bay Street in Jersey City, Hudson County, New Jersey, United States. Built as a warehouse and headquarters for The Great Atlantic & Pacific Tea Company (A&P) in 1900, it is the major surviving remnant of a five-building complex of the nation's first major grocery store chain. It was designated a National Historic Landmark in 1978, and now houses a mix of residences and storage facilities.

== Description and history ==
The former A&P warehouse is located just northeast of the central downtown area of Jersey City, on the west side of Prevost Street between 1st and Bay Streets. It is nine stories in height, constructed out of steel and reinforced concrete, with some wall sections fashioned from red brick. It has a footprint of 220 by 180 feet (67 m × 55 m), and had more than 360,000 square feet (33,000 m^{2}) of interior space. Architecturally, its facades are divided into rectangular sections by vertical piers and horizontal bands of concrete, with most sections housing several sash windows and some brickwork. All three street-facing facades are crowned by projecting cornices. Those three sides also originally had ground-level truck bays extending across most of their lengths, and the east side also featured a railroad siding.

The building was built by Turner Construction Company in 1900 for A&P, which had its start in New York City c. 1859 as an importer. It opened a grocery in Manhattan in 1864, and rapidly expanded, with 67 stores ranging as far west as St. Paul, Minnesota, and more than 15,000 by 1930. The Jersey City complex included five buildings devoted to the manufacture and distribution of the company's products and inventory. It was sold by the company in 1929. The building now houses a mix of residential rental units and a storage facility.

== See also ==
- A&P Warehouse (this structure's Manhattan predecessor)
- Harsimus
- Powerhouse Arts District, Jersey City
- National Register of Historic Places listings in Hudson County, New Jersey
- List of National Historic Landmarks in New Jersey
- Harsimus Cove Station
