= Frank =

Frank, FRANK, or Franks may refer to:

== People ==
- Frank (given name)
- Frank (surname)
- Franks (surname)
- Franks, a Germanic people in late Roman times
- Franks, a term in the Muslim world for all western Europeans, particularly during the Crusades
  - Farang, a Persian variation of this meaning

== Currency ==
- Liechtenstein franc or frank, the currency of Liechtenstein since 1920
- Swiss franc or frank, the currency of Switzerland since 1850
- Westphalian frank, currency of the Kingdom of Westphalia between 1808 and 1813
- The currencies of the German-speaking cantons of Switzerland (1803–1814):
  - Appenzell frank
  - Aargau frank
  - Basel frank
  - Berne frank
  - Fribourg frank
  - Glarus frank
  - Graubünden frank
  - Luzern frank
  - Schaffhausen frank
  - Schwyz frank
  - Solothurn frank
  - St. Gallen frank
  - Thurgau frank
  - Unterwalden frank
  - Uri frank
  - Zürich frank

== Places ==
- Frank, Alberta, Canada, an urban community, formerly a village
- Franks, Illinois, United States, an unincorporated community
- Franks, Missouri, United States, an unincorporated community
- Frank, North Carolina, United States, an unincorporated community
- Frank, West Virginia, United States, a census-designated place

== Arts and entertainment ==
=== Music ===
- Frank (band), a four-piece girl band created for a Channel 4 comedy drama series
- Frank (Amy Winehouse album), 2003
- Frank (Fly Anakin album), 2022
- Frank (Squeeze album), 1989
- Frank (Yerin Baek EP), 2015
- "Frank", a song by Infected Mushroom from their 2009 album Legend of the Black Shawarma
- "Frank", a song by Vowel Movement from their 1995 album Vowel Movement
- "Frank", a song by Ween from their 1991 album The Pod

=== Other arts and entertainment ===
- Frank (comics), a series of experimental comic books by Jim Woodring
- Frank (film), a 2014 comedy
- Frank (social network), an American social networking service

== Other uses ==
- Frank, a device or marking on mail - see Franking
- Frank (company), a student financial aid assistance company founded by Charlie Javice in 2016
- FRANK (drugs), a UK government drugs awareness campaign
- Frank (food), an alternate name for a hot dog or sausage
- Frank (magazine), a Canadian scandal sheet
- Frank: Academics for the Real World, a review published by the Clinton School of Public Service
- Frank's Nursery & Crafts, a defunct U.S. retailer
- Frank's Red Hot, a cayenne pepper hot sauce
- Nakajima Ki-84, Allied reporting name: Frank, a Japanese World War II fighter aircraft
- Storm Frank, a windstorm in Britain and Ireland in December 2015
- Tropical Storm Frank, a name borne by several tropical cyclones worldwide
- USS Franks (DD-554), a United States Navy warship
- The word frank is often used as an adjective or adverb to mean honest or direct.

== See also ==
- Francia, also known as the Kingdom of the Franks
- Franc
- Franck (disambiguation)
- Frankie (disambiguation)
