= Swiss franc =

Currency of Switzerland and Liechtenstein

Schweizer Franken (German); franc suisse (French); franco svizzero (Italian); franc svizzer (Romansh)
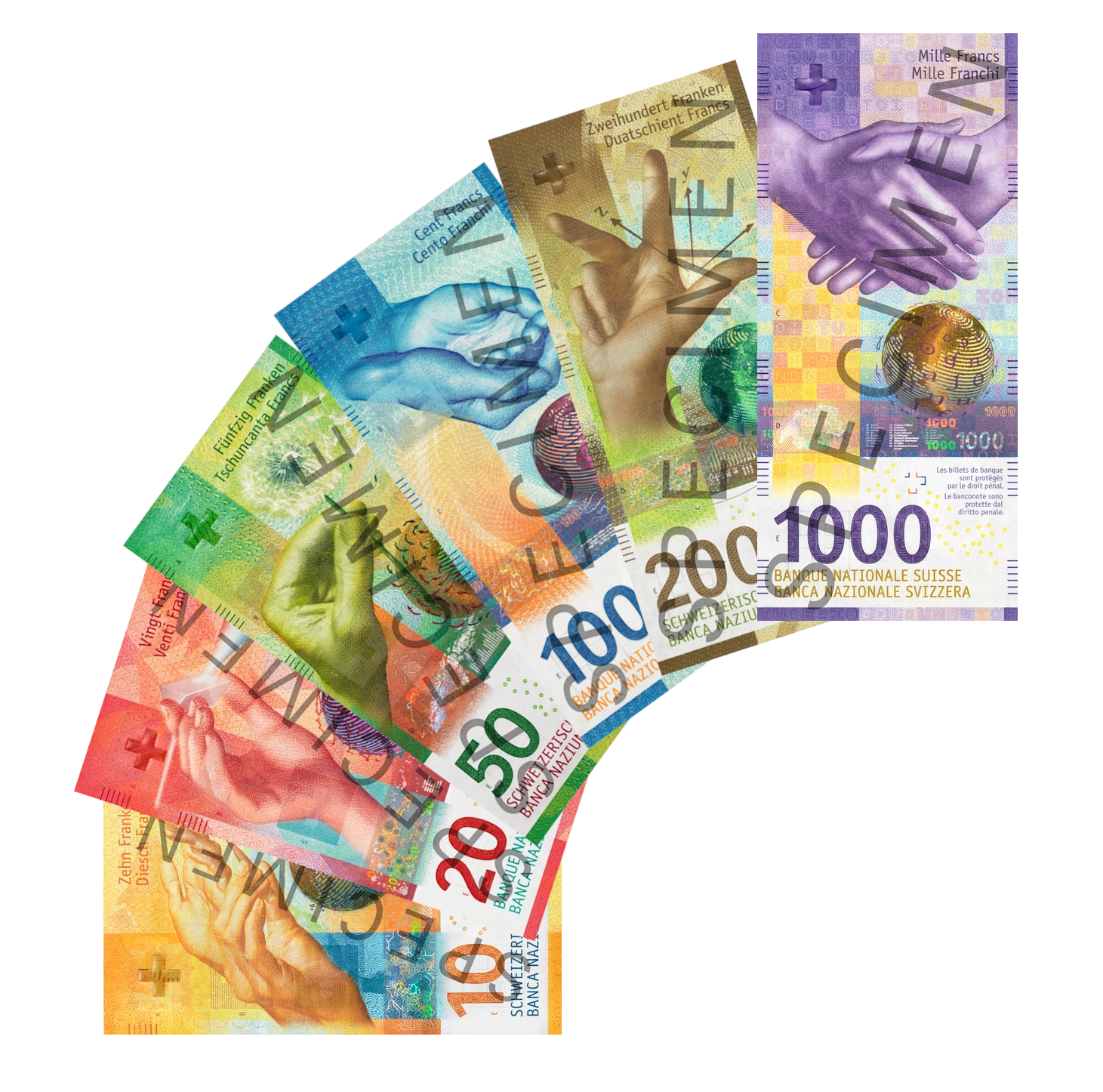
9th Series Banknotes
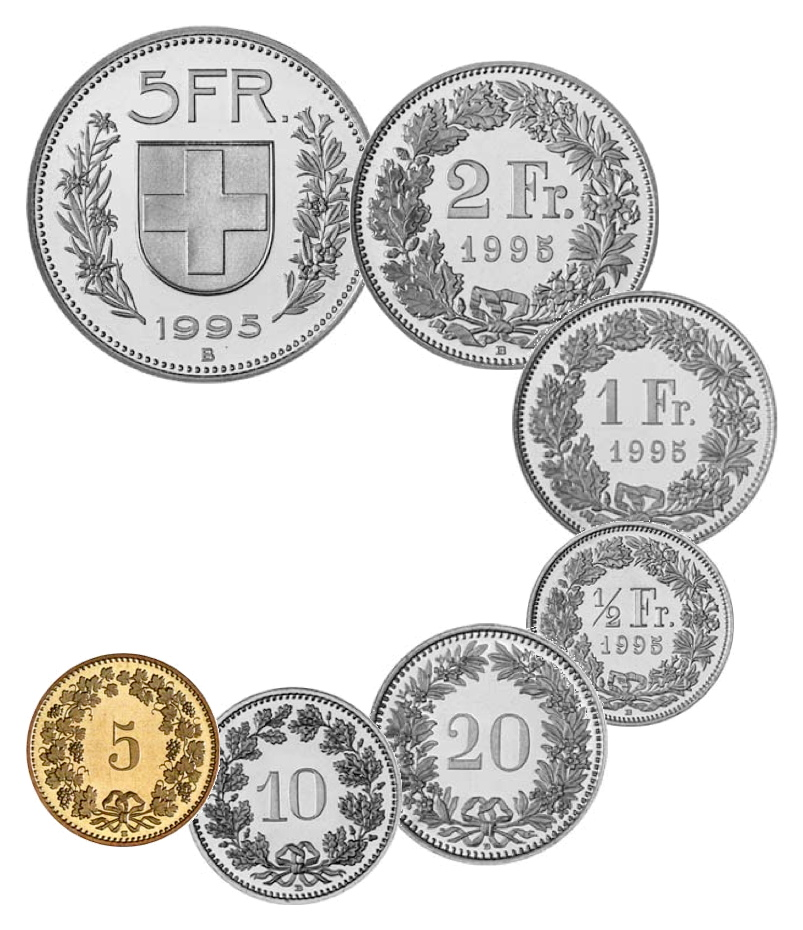
Coins

ISO 4217
- Code: CHF (numeric: 756)
- Subunit: 0.01

Units of account
- Base unit: Franken (German); franc (French); franco (Italian); franc (Romansh)
- Plural: List: Franken (German); francs (French); franchi (Italian); francs (Romansh)
- Symbol: Fr. and fr. (Note: The uppercase symbol Fr. is used in German; the lowercase fr. in French, Italian, and Romansh.)
- Nickname: List: Swiss German (selected examples): Füfräppler or Füfi (5-centime coin); Zëhräppler or Zähni (10-centime coin); Zwänzgräppler or Zwänzgi (20-centime coin); Füfzgi (50-centime coin); Stutz or Franke (1-franc coin or for "change" in general); Füüfliiber for a 5-franc coin; Rappe and Batze are specifically used for coins less than 1 franc, but also figuratively for "change" in general.; Swiss Standard German: Einfränkler (1-franc coin); Zweifränkler (2-franc coin); Hunderter (100-franc note); Ameise (1000-franc note); Swiss French: balle (1 franc or less); thune (5-franc coin)
- Subunit
- 1/100: Rappen (Rp.) (German); centime (c.) (French); centesimo (ct.) (Italian); rap (rp.) (Romansh)

Denominations
- Banknotes
- Freq. used: 10, 20, 50, 100, 200, 1000 francs
- Coins
- Freq. used: 5, 10, 20 centimes, 1/2, 1, 2, 5 francs

Demographics
- Official user(s): Switzerland; Liechtenstein
- Unofficial users: Germany: Büsingen am Hochrhein (Note: The Swiss franc is widely accepted in Büsingen am Hochrhein and Campione d'Italia, although the euro is officially used.); Italy: Campione d'Italia

Issuance
- Central bank: Swiss National Bank
- Website: www.snb.ch
- Printer: Orell Füssli
- Website: www.orellfuessli.com
- Mint: Swissmint
- Website: www.swissmint.ch

Valuation
- Inflation: 0.2% in 2025
- Source: Statistik Schweiz
- Method: Consumer price index

The Swiss franc (Note: Swiss Standard German: Schweizer Franken, pronounced [ˈʃvaɪtsər ˈfraŋkn̩]; French: franc suisse, pronounced [fʁɑ̃ sɥis]; Italian: franco svizzero, pronounced [ˈfraŋko ˈzvittsero]; Romansh: franc svizzer.) or simply the franc, (Note: Swiss Standard German: Franken, pronounced [ˈfraŋkn̩]; French: franc, pronounced [fʁɑ̃]; Italian: franco, pronounced [ˈfraŋko]; Romansh: franc.) (currency code: CHF; symbols: Fr. and fr.) is the currency and legal tender of Switzerland and Liechtenstein. It is also legal tender in the Italian exclave of Campione d'Italia, which is surrounded by Swiss territory. The Swiss National Bank (SNB) issues the banknotes, and the federal mint Swissmint issues the coins.

The ISO 4217 currency code, CHF, is derived from Confoederatio Helvetica, the official name of Switzerland in Latin; this is used due to the multilingual nature of Switzerland. "CHF" is sometimes also used internationally in place of a symbol.

Each franc is divided into one hundred subunits, known as Rappen (Rp.) in German, centime (c.) in French, centesimo (ct.) in Italian, and rap (rp.) in Romansh. The official symbols Fr. (in German) and fr. (in the Romance languages) are widely used by businesses and advertisers, including in English. However, according to Art. 1 SR/RS 941.101 of the federal law collection, the internationally official abbreviation – regardless of national languages – is CHF; respective guides also request that the ISO 4217 code be used. The use of the abbreviations SFr. and fr.sv. are obsolete.

== History ==
=== Before the Helvetic Republic ===
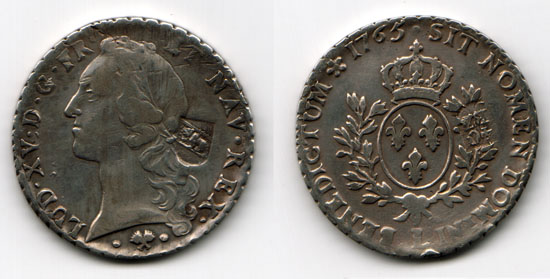
French ecu stamped "40 BZ" (batzen) in Bern became 4 franken under the Helvetic Republic.

Before 1798, about 75 entities were making coins in Switzerland, including the 25 cantons and half-cantons, 16 cities, and abbeys, resulting in about 860 different coins in circulation, with different values, denominations and monetary systems. However, the origins of a majority of these currencies can be traced to either the French livre tournois (the predecessor of the French franc) or the South German gulden of the 17th century. The new Swiss currencies emerged in the 18th century after Swiss cantons did not follow the pace of depreciations which occurred in France and Germany. However, they mostly existed only in small change as they were little more than community currency, current in one canton but not in the other, and foreign coins like French francs and kronenthalers were more recognized as currency all over Switzerland.

A high-level summary of existing currencies at the end of the 18th century is shown below, including their equivalents in terms of the French écu of 26.67 g fine silver, the South German kronenthaler of 25.71 g fine silver, and Swiss francs of 4.5 g fine silver.

Selected prominent Swiss cantonal currencies
Unit	Origin	Units per écu	Units per kronenthaler	CHF per unit
Bern livre	livre	4.00	3.90	1.465 F
Geneva livre	livre	3.643	3.536	1.616 F
South German gulden	gulden	2.80	2.70	2.116 F
Zurich gulden	gulden	2.50	2.45	2.332 F
Central Swiss gulden	gulden	3.00	2.925	1.954 F

The livre of Bern and most western Swiss cantons like Basel, Aargau, Fribourg, Vaud, Valais, Lausanne, Neuchâtel and Solothurn originated from the French livre tournois.

- The livre was divided into 20 sols, 10 batzen or 40 kreuzer.
- After 1690, 30 Bern batzen equated to either
  - a German Reichsthaler (25.984 g fine silver) worth 2 gulden or 120 kreuzer, or
  - a French Louis d'Argent, equivalent to the Spanish dollar (24.93 g fine silver), worth 3 livres tournois or 60 sols.
- After 1726, the French écu (laubthaler) of 26 2/3 g fine silver was valued at 4 livres or 40 batzen (compared to 6 livres tournois in France).
- After 1815, the German kronenthaler (Brabant thaler) of 25 5/7 g fine silver was valued at 3.9 livres or 39 batzen (in Neuchâtel, 4.1 livres).
- This livre or frank of 1/4 écu was the model for the frank of the Helvetic Republic of 1798–1847.
- Currencies identical to this standard include the Berne thaler, Basel thaler, Fribourg gulden, Neuchâtel gulden, Solothurn thaler and Valais thaler.

Geneva had its own currency, the florin petite monnaie, with 3 1/2 florins equal to the livre courant. After 1641, the Spanish dollar was worth 10 1/2 florins or 3 livres. Afterwards, the écu was valued at 12 3/4 florins or 3 9/14 livres, while the kronenthaler was valued at 12 3/8 florins or 3 15/28 livres. See also Geneva thaler and Geneva genevoise.

Many currencies of central and eastern Switzerland originated from the South German gulden. It was divided into 40 schilling or 60 kreuzer, and the thaler was worth 2 gulden. After 1690, this gulden was worth 1/2 a Reichsthaler specie, or 12.992 g fine silver. After 1730, the different guilders of Southern Germany and Switzerland fragmented under varying rates of depreciation. The South German gulden, worth 1/24 a Cologne mark (233.856 g) of fine silver, also applied to the Swiss cantons of St. Gallen, Appenzell, Schaffhausen and Thurgau. The French écu was valued at 2.8 gulden, while the kronenthaler was valued at 2.7 gulden. See St. Gallen thaler.

The cantons of Zurich, Schwyz and Glarus, however, maintained a stronger gulden worth 1/22 a Cologne mark of fine silver. The French écu was valued at 2 1/2 gulden, while the kronenthaler was valued at 2 18/40 gulden; see Zürich thaler and Schwyz gulden. On the other hand, the central Swiss cantons of Luzern, Uri, Zug and Unterwalden maintained a weaker gulden vs the South German gulden. The French écu was valued at 3 gulden, while the kronenthaler was valued at 2 37/40 gulden (see Luzern gulden).

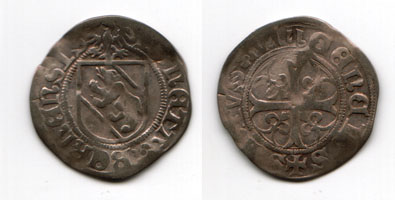
Bernese Rollbatzen, 15th century

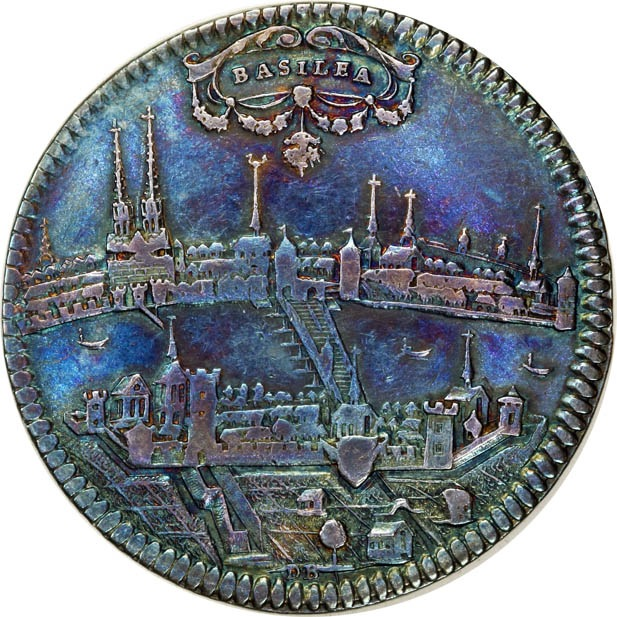
Basel taler (1690)

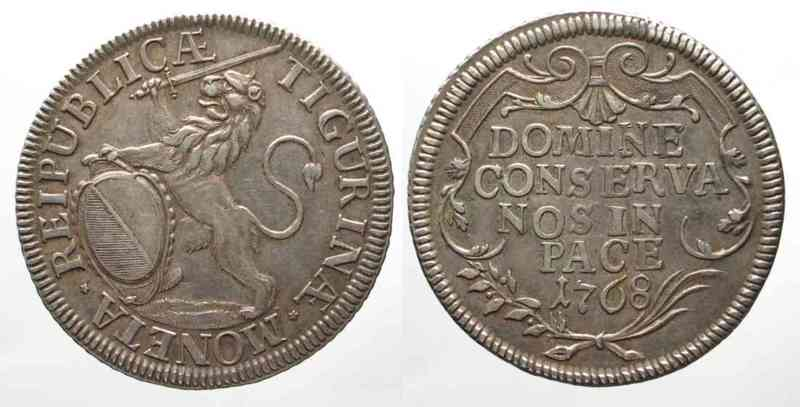
Zürich taler (1768)

=== Helvetic Republic to Regeneration, 1798–1847 ===
In 1798, the Helvetic Republic introduced the franc or frank, modelled on the Bern livre worth 1/4 the écu, subdivided into 10 batzen or 100 rappen (centimes). It contained 6 2/3 grams of fine silver and was initially worth 1 1/2 livres tournois or 1.48 French francs.

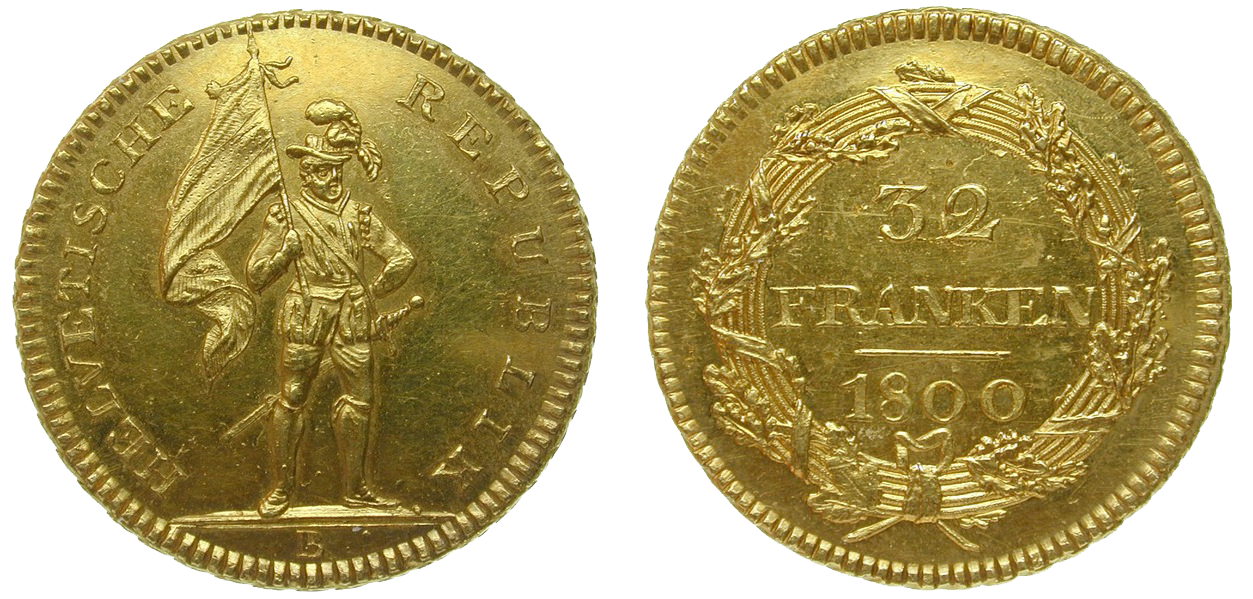
32 Franken gold coin of the Helvetic Republic (1800)

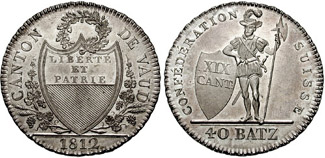
40 Batzen coin of Vaud (1812)

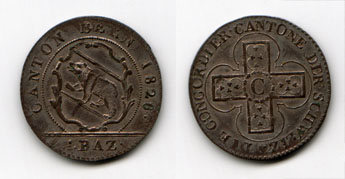
Bernese Konkordatsbatzen (1826)

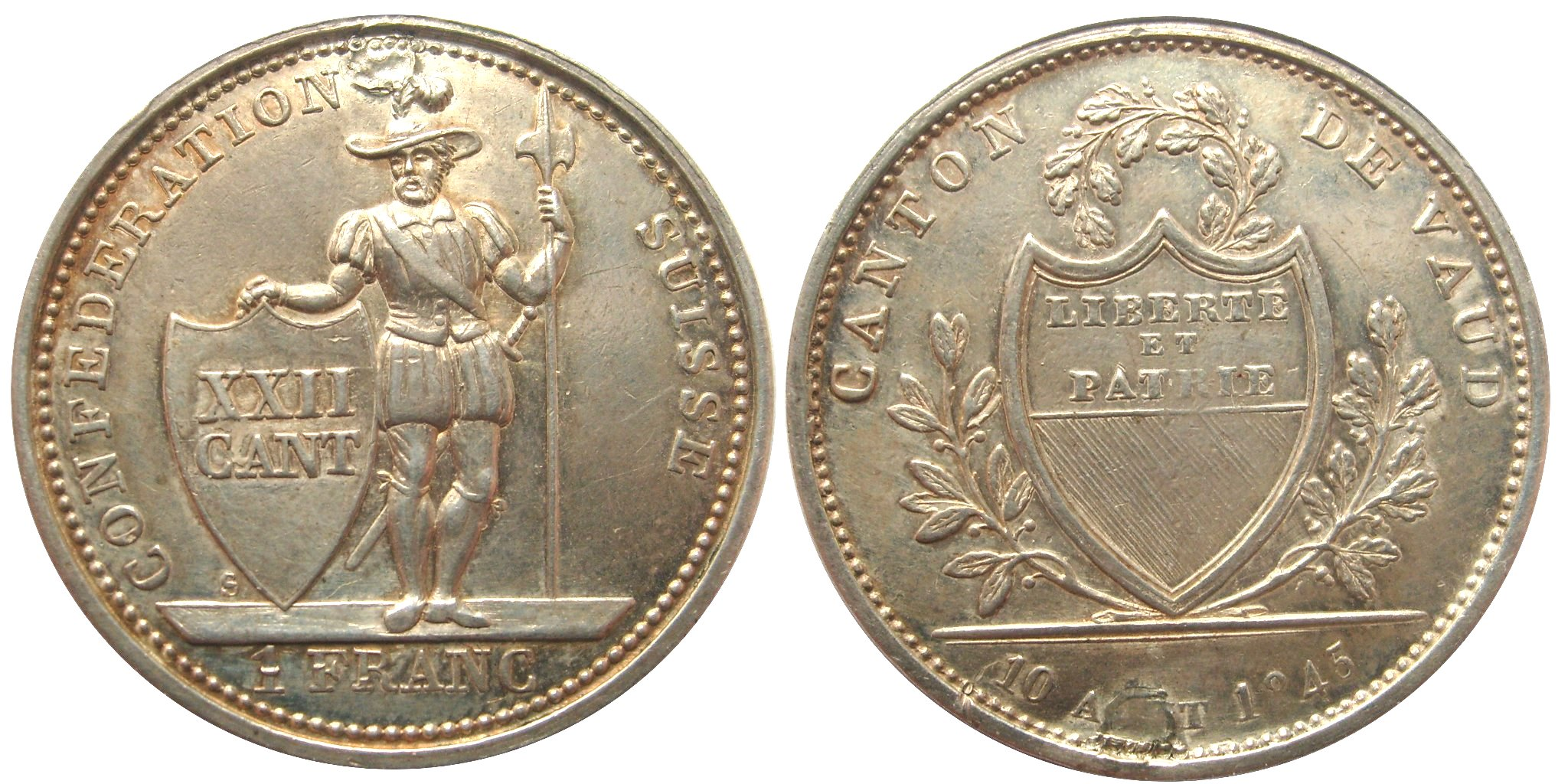
1 franc coin of Vaud (1845)

This franc was issued until the end of the Helvetic Republic in 1803, but served as the model for the currencies of several cantons in the Mediation period (1803–1814). These 19 cantonal currencies were the Appenzell frank, Argovia frank, Basel frank, Berne frank, Fribourg frank, Geneva franc, Glarus frank, Graubünden frank, Luzern frank, St. Gallen frank, Schaffhausen frank, Schwyz frank, Solothurn frank, Thurgau frank, Ticino franco, Unterwalden frank, Uri frank, Vaud franc, and Zürich frank.

After 1815, the restored Swiss Confederacy attempted to simplify the system of currencies once again. As of 1820, a total of 8,000 distinct coins were current in Switzerland: those issued by cantons, cities, abbeys, and principalities or lordships, mixed with surviving coins of the Helvetic Republic and the pre-1798 Helvetic Republic. In 1825, the cantons of Bern, Basel, Fribourg, Solothurn, Aargau, and Vaud formed a monetary concordate, issuing standardised coins, the so-called Konkordanzbatzen, still carrying the coat of arms of the issuing canton, but interchangeable and identical in value. The reverse side of the coin displayed a Swiss cross with the letter C in the center.

Despite these efforts, the situation remained complex. Before the introduction of the Swiss franc, seventy-two different entities issued currency. Daily payments were made with small coins, known as billons, which varied from canton to canton and were not necessarily accepted from one canton to another.

=== Franc of the Swiss Confederation, 1850–present ===
The Konkordanzbatzen among the Swiss cantons agreeing on an exclusive issue of currency in francs and batzen failed to replace the over 8,000 different coins and notes in circulation. Despite introduction of the first Swiss franc, the South German kronenthaler became the more desirable coin to use in the 19th century, and it was still quoted in pre-1798 currency equivalents. Furthermore, less than 15% of Swiss money in circulation was in local currency, since French and German gold and silver trade coins proved to be more desirable means of exchange. A final problem was that the first Swiss franc was based on the French écu which was being phased out by France in the 19th century.

To solve this problem, the new Swiss Federal Constitution of 1848 specified that the federal government would be the only entity allowed to issue money in Switzerland. This was followed two years later by the first Federal Coinage Act, passed by the Federal Assembly on 7 May 1850, which introduced the franc as the monetary unit of Switzerland.

The Swiss franc was introduced at par with the French franc, at 4.5 g fine silver or 9/31 g = 0.29032 g fine gold (ratio 15.5). The currencies of the Swiss cantons were converted to Swiss francs by first restating their equivalents in German kronenthaler (écu brabant) of 25 5/7 grams fine silver, and then to Swiss francs at the rate of 7 écu brabant = 40 Swiss francs. The first franc worth 1/4th the French écu was converted at 1.4597 Swiss francs.

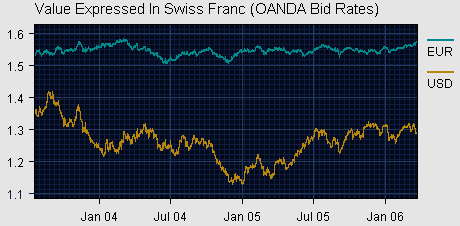
Exchange rates with the euro and U.S. dollar, 2003–2006

In 1865, France, Belgium, Italy, and Switzerland formed the Latin Monetary Union, in which they agreed to value their national currencies to a standard of 4.5 grams of fine silver or 0.290322 grams fine gold, equivalent to US$1 = CHF 5.1826 until 1934. Even after the monetary union faded away in the 1920s and officially ended in 1927, the Swiss franc remained on that standard until 27 September 1936, when it suffered its sole devaluation during the Great Depression. Following the devaluations of the British pound, U.S. dollar and French franc, the Swiss franc was devalued 30% to 0.20322 grams fine gold, equivalent to US$1 = CHF 4.37295. In 1945, Switzerland joined the Bretton Woods system with its exchange rate to the dollar fixed until 1970.

The Swiss franc has historically been considered a safe-haven currency, with a legal requirement that a minimum of 40% be backed by gold reserves. However, this link to gold, which dated from the 1920s, was terminated on 1 May 2000 following a referendum, making the franc fiat money. By March 2005, following a gold-selling program, the Swiss National Bank held 1,290 tonnes of gold in reserves, which equated to 20% of its assets.

In November 2014, the referendum on the "Swiss Gold Initiative", which proposed a restoration of 20% gold backing for the Swiss franc, was voted down.

==== 2011–2014: Big movements and capping ====
Euro – Swiss franc exchange rate from 1999. During 2011 to 2014, 1 EUR exchanged for no less than 1.2 CHF, since the Swiss central bank enforced an exchange rate to prevent CHF from "overvaluation". In the diagram, this period started on 6 September 2011 with a sharp rise and ended on 15 January 2015 with a sharp fall.

The onset of the Greek sovereign debt crisis resulted in a strong appreciation in the value of the Swiss franc, past US$1.10 (CHF 0.91 per USD) in March 2011, to US$1.20 (CHF 0.833 per USD) in June 2011, and to US$1.30 (CHF 0.769 per USD) in August 2011. This prompted the Swiss National Bank to boost the franc's liquidity to try to counter its "massive overvaluation". The Economist argued that its Big Mac Index in July 2011 indicated an overvaluation of 98% over the dollar, and cited Swiss companies releasing profit warnings and threatening to move operations out of the country due to the strength of the franc. Demand for francs and franc-denominated assets was so strong that nominal short-term Swiss interest rates became negative.

On 6 September 2011, the day after the franc traded at 1.11 CHF/€ and appeared headed to parity with the euro, the SNB set a minimum exchange rate of 1.20 CHF to the euro ('capping' the franc's appreciation), saying "the value of the franc is a threat to the economy", and that it was "prepared to buy foreign currency in unlimited quantities". In response to this announcement the franc fell against the euro from 1.11 to 1.20 CHF, against the U.S. dollar from 0.787 to 0.856 CHF, and against all 16 of the most active currencies on the same day. It was the largest plunge of the franc ever against the euro.

The intervention stunned currency traders, since the franc had long been regarded as a safe haven. The SNB had previously set an exchange rate target in 1978 against the Deutsche mark and maintained it, although at the cost of high inflation. Until mid-January 2015, the franc continued to trade below the target level set by the SNB, though the ceiling was broken at least once on 5 April 2012, albeit briefly.

==== End of capping ====
On 18 December 2014, the Swiss central bank introduced a negative interest rate on bank deposits to support its CHF ceiling. However, with the euro declining in value over the following weeks, in a move dubbed 'Francogeddon' for its effect on markets, the Swiss National Bank abandoned the ceiling on 15 January 2015, and the franc promptly increased in value compared with the euro by 30%, although this only lasted a few minutes before part of the increase was reversed. The move was not announced in advance and resulted in "turmoil" in stock and currency markets. By the close of trading that day, the franc was up 23% against the euro and 21% against the US dollar. The full daily appreciation of the franc was equivalent to $31,000 per single futures contract: more than the market had moved collectively in the previous thousand days. The key CHF interest rate was also lowered from −0.25% to −0.75%, meaning depositors would be paying an increased fee to keep their funds in a Swiss bank account. This devaluation of the euro against the franc was expected to hurt Switzerland's large export industry. The Swatch Group, for example, saw its shares drop 15% (in Swiss franc terms) with the announcements so that the share price may have increased on that day in terms of other major currencies.

The large and unexpected jump caused major losses for some currency traders. Alpari, a Russian-owned spread betting firm established in the UK, temporarily declared insolvency before announcing its desire to be acquired (and later denied rumours of an acquisition) by FXCM. FXCM was bailed out by its parent company. Saxo Bank of Denmark reported losses on 19 January 2015. New Zealand foreign exchange broker Global Brokers NZ announced it "could no longer meet New Zealand regulators' minimum capital requirements" and terminated its business.

==== 2026 onwards ====
In January 2026, the Swiss franc gained 3.5% against the U.S. dollar this year, driven higher amid unpredictable U.S. trade policy, questions over the independence of the Federal Reserve, and the threat of American military intervention in Greenland, Latin America and the Middle East. That came after it strengthened 12.7% against the U.S. dollar in 2025. This led to it reaching an 11-year high against the dollar.

== Coins ==
=== Coins before the Helvetic Republic ===
Coins before 1700 were based on either the French livre tournois system (in Louis d'Argent, Louis d'Or and fractions) or the South German gulden system (in Reichsthalers, florins and fractions). After 1700 Swiss cantonal currencies diverged from the value of the French and German units. However, they mostly existed only in small change as they were a mere community currency, current in one canton but not in the other, and foreign coins like French francs and Brabant dollars were more recognized as currency all over Switzerland.

=== Coins of the Helvetic Republic ===
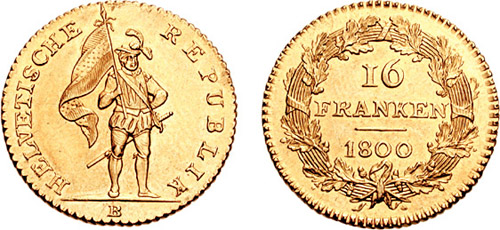
16 franc gold coin of the Helvetic Republic (1800)

Between 1798 and 1803, billon coins were issued in denominations of 1 centime, 1/2 batzen, and 1 batzen. Silver coins were issued for 10, 20 and 40 batzen (also denominated 4 francs), matching with French coins worth 1/4, 1/2 and 1 écu. Gold 16- and 32-franc coins were issued in 1800, also matching with French coins worth 24 and 48 livres tournois.

=== Coins of the Swiss Confederation ===
In 1850, coins were introduced in denominations of 1 centime, 2 centimes, 5 centimes, 10 centimes 20 centimes, 1/2 franc, 1 franc, 2 francs, and 5 francs. The 1 centime and 2 centime coins were struck in bronze; the 5 centimes, 10 centime and 20 centime in billon (with 5% to 15% silver content); and the 1/2 franc, 1 franc, 2 franc and 5 franc in .900 fine silver. Between 1860 and 1863, .800 fine silver was used, before the standard used in France of .835 fineness was adopted for all silver coins except the 5 francs (which remained .900 fineness) in 1875. In 1879, billon was replaced by cupronickel in the 5 centime and 10 centime coins and by nickel in the 20 centime piece. Gold coins in denominations of 10, 20, and 100 francs, known as Vreneli, circulated until 1936.

Both world wars only had a small effect on the Swiss coinage, with brass and zinc coins temporarily being issued. In 1931, the mass of the 5 franc coin was reduced from 25 grams to 15, with the silver content reduced to .835 fineness. The next year, nickel replaced cupronickel in the 5 centime and 10 centime coins.

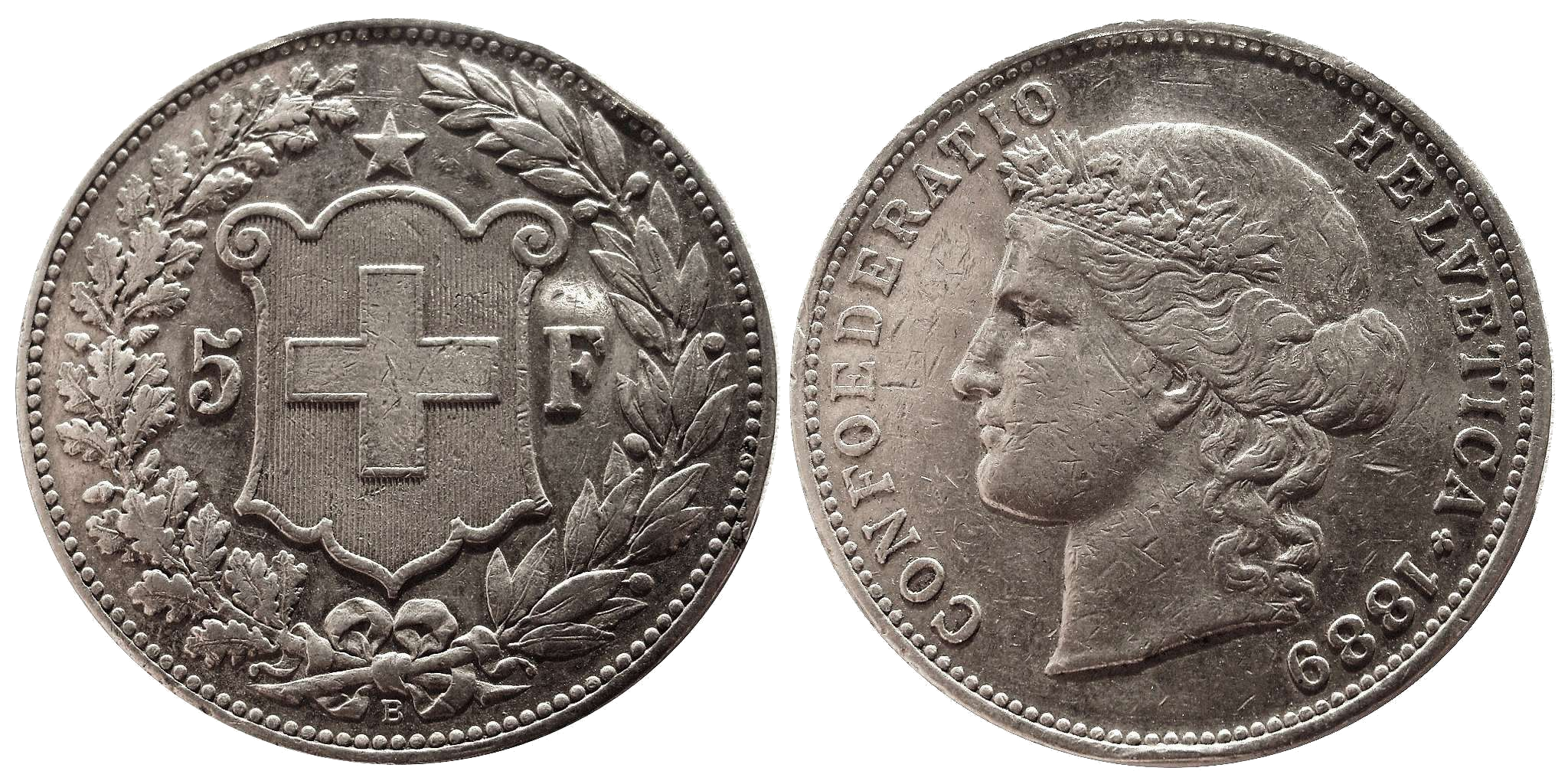
5 Swiss francs coin minted in 1889

In the late 1960s, the prices of internationally traded commodities rose significantly. A silver coin's metal value exceeded its monetary value, and many were being sent abroad for melting, which prompted the federal government to make this practice illegal. The statute was of little effect, and the melting of francs only subsided when the collectible value of the remaining francs again exceeded their material value.

The 1 centime coin was still produced until 2006, albeit in ever decreasing quantities, but its importance declined. Those who could justify the use of 1 centime coins for monetary purposes could obtain them at face value; any other user (such as collectors) had to pay an additional four centimes per coin to cover the production costs, which had exceeded the actual face value of the coin for many years. The coin fell into disuse in the late 1970s and early 1980s, but was only officially fully withdrawn from circulation and declared to be no longer legal tender on 1 January 2007. The long-forgotten 2 centime coin, not minted since 1974, was demonetized on 1 January 1978.

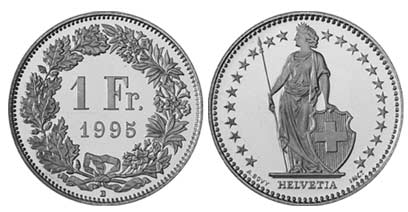
1 Swiss franc coin minted in 1995

The designs of the coins have changed very little since 1879. Among the notable changes were new designs for the 5 francs coins in 1888, 1922, 1924 (minor), and 1931 (mostly just a size reduction). A new design for the bronze coins was used from 1948. Coins depicting a ring of stars (such as the 1 franc coin seen beside this paragraph) were altered from 22 stars to 23 stars in 1983; since the stars represent the Swiss cantons, the design was updated when in 1979 Jura seceded from the Canton of Bern and became the 23rd canton of the Swiss Confederation.

3D animation of the surface of a 1/2-franc coin

The 10 centime coins from 1879 onwards (except the years 1918–19 and 1932–1939) have had the same composition, size, and design to present and are still legal tender and found in circulation. For this, the coin entered the Guinness Book of Records as the oldest original currency in circulation.

All Swiss coins are language-neutral with respect to Switzerland's four national languages, featuring only numerals, the abbreviation "Fr." for franc, and the Latin phrases Helvetia or Confœderatio Helvetica (depending on the denomination) or the inscription Libertas (Roman goddess of liberty) on the small coins. The name of the artist is present on the coins with the standing Helvetia and the herder.

In addition to these general-circulation coins, numerous series of commemorative coins have been issued, as well as silver and gold coins. These coins are no longer legal tender, but can in theory be exchanged at face value at post offices, and at national and cantonal banks, although their metal or collectors' value equals or exceeds their face value.

Circulating coins
Image	Value	Technical parameters				Description			Issued from
Image	Value	Diameter (mm)	Thickness (mm)	Mass (g)	Composition	Edge	Obverse	Reverse	Issued from
	5 c	17.15	1.25	1.80	Aluminium bronze: Cu: 92% Al: 6% Ni: 2%	Smooth	Liberty (Karl Schwenzer); year of issue; Lettering: CONFŒDERATIO; HELVETICA	Value; mintmark; wreath of grapes	1981–present
	10 c	19.15	1.45	3.00	Cupronickel: Cu: 75% Ni: 25%	Smooth	Liberty (Karl Schwenzer); year of issue; Lettering: CONFŒDERATIO; HELVETICA	Value; mintmark; wreath of oak leaves	1879–1915; 1919–1931; 1940–present
	20 c	21.05	1.65	4.00	Cupronickel: Cu: 75% Ni: 25%	Smooth	Liberty (Karl Schwenzer); year of issue; Lettering: CONFŒDERATIO; HELVETICA	Value; mintmark; wreath of gentian	1939–present
	1/2 Fr	18.20	1.25	2.20	Cupronickel: Cu: 75% Ni: 25%	Reeded	Helvetia (Albert Walch); circle of 23 stars; Lettering: HELVETIA; A BOVY INCT	Value; mintmark; year of issue; wreath of oak leaves and gentian	1968–present
	1 Fr	23.20	1.55	4.40	Cupronickel: Cu: 75% Ni: 25%	Reeded	Helvetia (Albert Walch); circle of 23 stars; Lettering: HELVETIA; A BOVY INCT	Value; mintmark; year of issue; wreath of oak leaves and gentian	1968–present
	2 Fr	27.40	2.15	8.80	Cupronickel: Cu: 75% Ni: 25%	Reeded	Helvetia (Albert Walch); circle of 23 stars; Lettering: HELVETIA; A BOVY INCT	Value; mintmark; year of issue; wreath of oak leaves and gentian	1968–present
	5 Fr	31.45	2.35	13.20	Cupronickel: Cu: 75% Ni: 25%	Embossed lettering: DOMINUS PROVIDEBIT ★★★★★★★★★★★★★	Herdsman (Paul Burkhard); Lettering: CONFŒDERATIO; HELVETICA; P BVRKHARD INCT	Coat of arms; edelweiss and gentian branches; value; mintmark; year of issue	1968–1983; 1991–present

== Banknotes ==
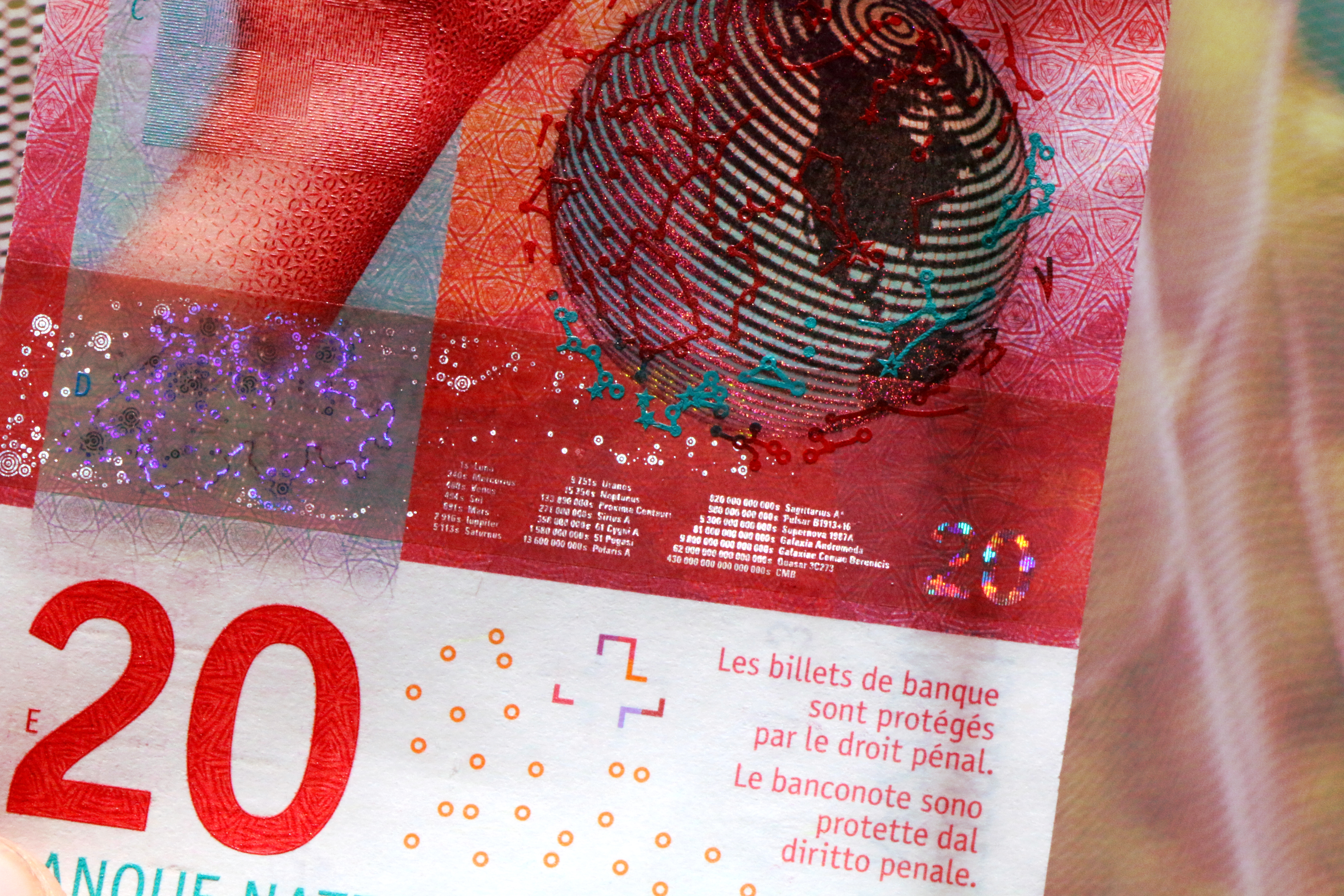
Fine print of a CHF 20 banknote, with distances between earth and various celestial bodies in light-seconds

In 1907, the Swiss National Bank took over the issuance of banknotes from the cantons and various banks. It introduced denominations of 50, 100, 500 and 1000 francs. Twenty-franc notes were introduced in 1911, followed by 5-franc notes in 1913. In 1914, the Federal Treasury issued paper money in denominations of 5, 10 and 20 francs. These notes were issued in three different versions: French, German and Italian. The State Loan Bank also issued 25-franc notes that year. In 1952, the national bank ceased issuing 5-franc notes but introduced 10-franc notes in 1955. In 1996, 200-franc notes were introduced whilst the 500-franc note was discontinued.

Nine series of banknotes have been printed by the Swiss National Bank, seven of which have been released for use by the general public, the fourth and seventh being reserved and never issued. The sixth series from 1976, designed by Ernst and Ursula Hiestand, depicted persons from the world of science. This series was recalled on 1 May 2000 and is no longer legal tender, but notes can still be exchanged for valid ones of the same face value at any National Bank branch or authorized agent, or mailed in by post to the National Bank in exchange for a bank account deposit. The exchange program originally was due to end on 30 April 2020, after which sixth-series notes would lose all value. As of 2016, 1.1 billion francs' worth of sixth-series notes had not yet been exchanged, even though they had not been legal tender for 16 years and only 4 more years remained to exchange them. To avoid having to expire such large amounts of money in 2020, the Federal Council (cabinet) and National Bank proposed in April 2017 to remove the time limit on exchanges for the sixth and future recalled series. As of 2020, this proposal was enacted, so old banknote series will not expire.

The seventh series was printed in 1984, but kept as a "reserve series", ready to be used if, for example, wide counterfeiting of the current series suddenly happened. When the Swiss National Bank decided to develop new security features and to abandon the concept of a reserve series, the details of the seventh series were released and the printed notes were destroyed.

=== Eighth series ===
The eighth series of banknotes was designed by Jörg Zintzmeyer around the theme of the arts and released starting in 1995. In addition to its new vertical design, this series was different from the previous one on several counts. Probably the most important difference from a practical point of view was that the seldom-used 500-franc note was replaced by a new 200-franc note; this new note has indeed proved more successful than the old 500-franc note. (Note: The global value of those 200-franc notes in circulation in 2000 (5.1200 billion francs) was larger than the value of the 500-franc notes in 1996 (3.9123 billion), even when these figures are corrected for the global increase in total value of Swiss banknotes in circulation (+9%). Figures from the Monthly Statistical Bulletin of the Swiss National Bank, January 2006.) The base colours of the new notes were kept similar to the old ones, except that the 20-franc note was changed from blue to red to prevent a frequent confusion with the 100-franc note, and that the 10-franc note was changed from red to yellow. The size of the notes was changed as well, with all notes from the eighth series having the same height (74 mm), while the widths were changed as well, still increasing with the value of the notes. The new series contain many more security features than the previous ones; many of them are now visibly displayed and have been widely advertised, in contrast with the previous series for which most of the features were kept secret.

Eighth series (1995–1998) Designer: Jörg Zintzmeyer
Image		Value	Dimensions (mm)	Main colour	Description		Issue	Withdrawn
Obverse	Reverse	Value	Dimensions (mm)	Main colour	Obverse	Reverse	Issue	Withdrawn
		10 francs	74 × 126	Yellow	Le Corbusier	Ground plan, government district of Chandigarh, India	8 April 1995	30 April 2021
		20 francs	74 × 137	Red	Arthur Honegger	Pacific 231	1 October 1994	30 April 2021
		50 francs	74 × 148	Green	Sophie Taeuber-Arp	Tête Dada, 1919	3 October 1995	30 April 2021
		100 francs	74 × 159	Blue	Alberto Giacometti	L'Homme qui marche I	1 October 1998	30 April 2021
		200 francs	74 × 170	Brown	Charles Ferdinand Ramuz	Lac de Derborence (Les Diablerets), Lavaux	1 October 1997	30 April 2021
		1000 francs	74 × 181	Purple	Jacob Burckhardt	Palazzo Strozzi, Florence	1 April 1998	30 April 2021
For table standards, see the banknote specification table.

All banknotes are quadrilingual, displaying all information in the four national languages. With the eighth series, the banknotes depicting a Germanophone person have German and Romansch on the same side as the picture, whereas banknotes depicting a Francophone or an Italophone person have French and Italian on the same side as the picture. The reverse has the other two languages.

When the fifth series lost its validity at the end of April 2000, the banknotes that had not been exchanged represented a total value of 244.3 million Swiss francs; in accordance with Swiss law, this amount was transferred to the Swiss Fund for Emergency Losses in the Case of Non-insurable Natural Disasters.

=== Current series ===
In February 2005, a competition was announced for the design of the ninth series, then planned to be released around 2010 on the theme "Switzerland open to the world". The results were announced in November 2005. The National Bank selected the designs of Swiss graphic designer Manuela Pfrunder as the basis of the new series. The first denomination to be issued was the 50-franc note on 12 April 2016. It was followed by the 20-franc note (17 May 2017), the 10-franc note (18 October 2017), the 200-franc note (15 August 2018), the 1000-franc note (5 March 2019), and the 100-franc note (12 September 2019).

All banknotes from the eighth series were withdrawn on 30 April 2021, but, like banknotes of the sixth series withdrawn in 2000, remain indefinitely redeemable at the Swiss National Bank.

Ninth series (2016–2018) Designer: Manuela Pfrunder
Image		Value	Dimensions (mm)	Main colour	Description			Issue
Obverse	Reverse	Value	Dimensions (mm)	Main colour	Theme (Swiss characteristic)	Obverse (action)	Reverse (location and object)	Issue
		10 francs	70 × 123	Yellow	Time; Organisational talent	Hands conducting with a baton; Globe: around the IDL, End of Day (Pacific Ocean); Time zones; Background: Clock faces; Security strip: Swiss rail network and its longest tunnels	Lötschberg Base Tunnel rail tracks, reducing travel time; Watch's movement: symbolising strong organisational talent; Rail network lines	18 October 2017
		20 francs	70 × 130	Red	Light; Creativity	Hand with a prism and light; Globe: 4 hours earlier (Pacific Ocean, Americas); constellations; Background: Kaleidoscope; Security strip: Night-time light emissions; distances in light seconds between Earth and celestial bodies	Light beaming a movie to a large outdoor screen on the Piazza Grande in Locarno during the Locarno Film Festival; Butterfly: Light reveals the wings' colour; Iris lines	17 May 2017
		50 francs	70 × 137	Green	Wind; Wealth of experiences	Hand holding a dandelion; pappi carried by the wind; Globe: another 4 hours earlier (Africa, Americas); wind directions; Background: Wind flow arrows; Security strip: Swiss Alps and four-thousand-metre peaks list	Wind streaming around the Swiss Alps's glaciated mountain peaks; Paraglider: the wind keeping it aloft; Contour lines: evokes the Swiss varied landscapes	12 April 2016
		100 francs	70 × 144	Blue	Water; Humanitarian tradition	Hands holding, providing water; Globe: another 4 hours earlier (Europe, Africa); isobars and contour lines; Security strip: Switzerland's rivers and its longest rivers	Water flowing alongside a mountain side in Valais; German: Suonen/French: des bisses: irrigation channels	12 September 2019
		200 francs	70 × 151	Brown	Matter; Scientific expertise	Hand pointing to the three dimensions (right-hand rule); Globe: another 4 hours earlier (Africa, Eurasia); Late Cretaceous period land masses; Security strip: Swiss geological ages map; timeline of the universe's formation stages	Signals from a particle collision in a detector at the CERN Large Hadron Collider in Geneva; Particle collision map	22 August 2018
		1000 francs	70 × 158	Purple	Language; Communicative flair	Handshake; Globe: another 4 hours earlier, Start of Day (Eastern Asia, Australia); IPA letters; Security strip: Map of the Swiss language regions; list of Swiss cantons	Holding speeches in different languages in the Swiss parliament during the Federal Assembly at Bern; Relation graph	13 March 2019
For table standards, see the banknote specification table.

== Circulation ==
Most traded currencies by value Currency distribution of global foreign exchange market turnover
Currency	ISO 4217 code	Proportion of daily volume		Change (2022–2025)
Currency	ISO 4217 code	April 2022	April 2025	Change (2022–2025)
United States dollar	USD	88.4%	89.2%	▲0.8pp
Euro	EUR	30.6%	28.9%	▼1.7pp
Japanese yen	JPY	16.7%	16.8%	▲0.1pp
Pound sterling	GBP	12.9%	10.2%	▼2.7pp
Renminbi	CNY	7.0%	8.5%	▲1.5pp
Swiss franc	CHF	5.2%	6.4%	▲1.2pp
Australian dollar	AUD	6.4%	6.1%	▼0.3pp
Canadian dollar	CAD	6.2%	5.8%	▼0.4pp
Hong Kong dollar	HKD	2.6%	3.8%	▲1.2pp
Singapore dollar	SGD	2.4%	2.4%	Steady
Indian rupee	INR	1.6%	1.9%	▲0.3pp
South Korean won	KRW	1.8%	1.8%	Steady
Swedish krona	SEK	2.2%	1.6%	▼0.6pp
Mexican peso	MXN	1.5%	1.6%	▲0.1pp
New Zealand dollar	NZD	1.7%	1.5%	▼0.2pp
Norwegian krone	NOK	1.7%	1.3%	▼0.4pp
New Taiwan dollar	TWD	1.1%	1.2%	▲0.1pp
Brazilian real	BRL	0.9%	0.9%	Steady
South African rand	ZAR	1.0%	0.8%	▼0.2pp
Polish złoty	PLN	0.7%	0.8%	▲0.1pp
Danish krone	DKK	0.7%	0.7%	Steady
Indonesian rupiah	IDR	0.4%	0.7%	▲0.3pp
Turkish lira	TRY	0.4%	0.5%	▲0.1pp
Thai baht	THB	0.4%	0.5%	▲0.1pp
Israeli new shekel	ILS	0.4%	0.4%	Steady
Hungarian forint	HUF	0.3%	0.4%	▲0.1pp
Czech koruna	CZK	0.4%	0.4%	Steady
Chilean peso	CLP	0.3%	0.3%	Steady
Philippine peso	PHP	0.2%	0.2%	Steady
Colombian peso	COP	0.2%	0.2%	Steady
Malaysian ringgit	MYR	0.2%	0.2%	Steady
UAE dirham	AED	0.4%	0.1%	▼0.3pp
Saudi riyal	SAR	0.2%	0.1%	▼0.1pp
Romanian leu	RON	0.1%	0.1%	Steady
Peruvian sol	PEN	0.1%	0.1%	Steady
Other currencies		2.6%	3.4%	▲0.8pp
Total (Note: The total sum is 200% because each currency trade is counted twice: once for the currency being bought and once for the currency being sold. The percentages above represent the proportion of all trades involving a given currency, regardless of which side of the transaction it is on.)		200.0%	200.0%	

The Swiss franc is the currency and legal tender of Switzerland and Liechtenstein and also legal tender in the Italian exclave of Campione d'Italia. Although not formally legal tender in the German exclave of Büsingen am Hochrhein (the sole legal currency is the euro), it is in wide daily use there; with many prices quoted in Swiss francs. The Swiss franc is the only version of the franc still issued in Europe.

As of March 2010, the total value of released Swiss coins and banknotes was 49.664 billion Swiss francs.

Value of Swiss coins and banknotes in circulation as of March 2010 (in millions of CHF)
Coins	10 francs	20 francs	50 francs	100 francs	200 francs	500 francs	1000 francs	Total
2,695.4	656.7	1,416.7	1,963.0	8,337.4	6,828.0	129.9	27,637.1	49,664.0

Combinations of up to 100 circulating Swiss coins (not including special or commemorative coins) are legal tender; banknotes are legal tender for any amount.

== Current exchange rates ==
Current CHF exchange rates
From Google Finance:	AUD CAD CNY EUR GBP HKD JPY USD TRY
From Yahoo! Finance:	AUD CAD CNY EUR GBP HKD JPY USD TRY
From XE.com:	AUD CAD CNY EUR GBP HKD JPY USD TRY
From OANDA:	AUD CAD CNY EUR GBP HKD JPY USD TRY

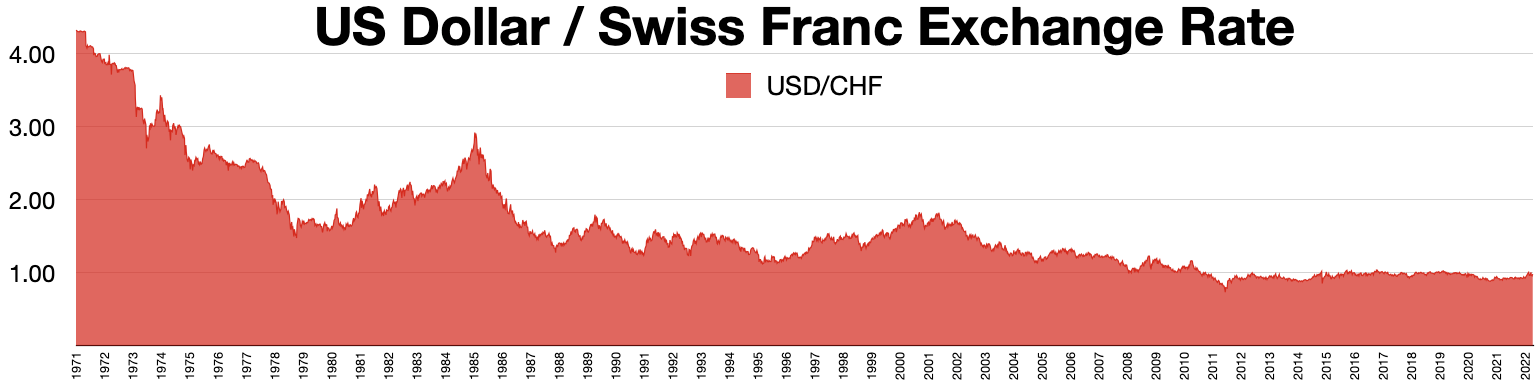
US Dollar / Swiss Franc exchange rate

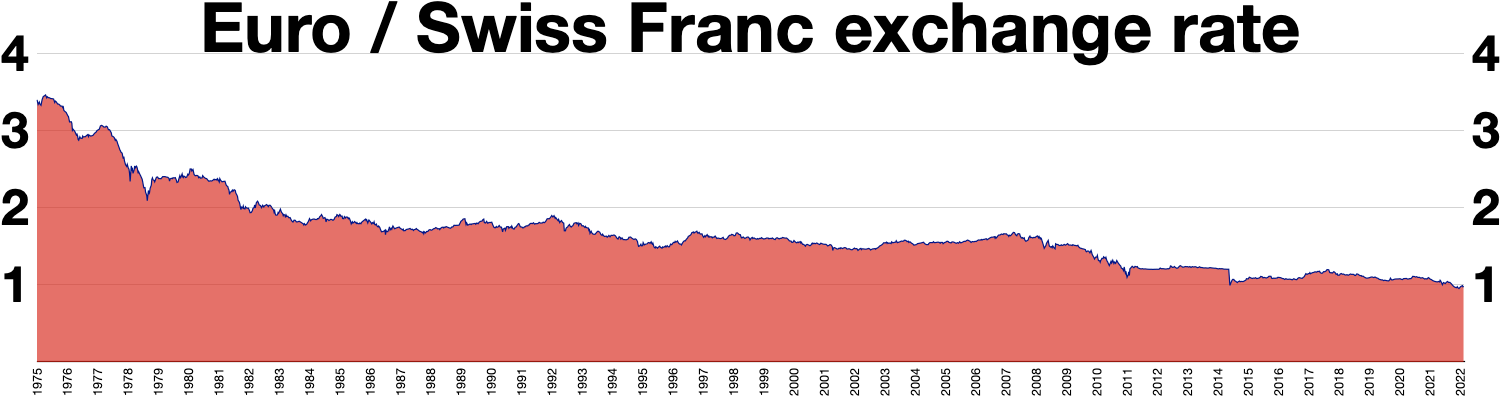
Euro to Swiss Franc exchange rate

== See also ==
- Banking in Switzerland
- Economy of Switzerland
- Gold standard
- Hard currency
- Iraqi Swiss dinar, a common name for the old Iraqi currency but not related to Swiss currency.
- Liechtenstein franc
- List of currencies in Europe
- Vreneli
