= Frankish =

Frankish may refer to:

- Franks, a Germanic tribe and their culture
  - Frankish language or its modern descendants, Franconian languages, a group of Low Germanic languages also commonly referred to as "Frankish" varieties
- Francia, a post-Roman state in France and Germany
- East Francia, the successor state to Francia in Germany
- West Francia, the successor state to Francia in France
- Crusaders
- Levantines (Latin Christians)

== Family name ==
- Ernest Frankish (1876–1962), New Zealand cricketer
- Keith Frankish (born 1962), British philosopher
- Kevin Frankish, Canadian television presenter and media personality
- Pat Frankish, British psychologist and psychotherapist
- Ronald Frankish (1925–2013), Australian cricketer
- Stanley Frankish (1872–1909), New Zealand cricketer

== See also ==
- Farang, Persian for 'Franks', later used for Western or Latin Europeans; in Arabic 'Faranj'
- Franconian (disambiguation)
- Franks (disambiguation)
- Name of the Franks
- Franks
- Frank
- Franck
- Francke, Franke
- Franken, Francken
- Fränkel, Frenkel
- Frankel
- Frankl
