= Zürich thaler =

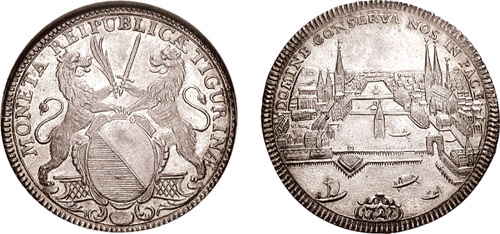
Zürich thaler
| MONETA REIPUBLICÆ TIGURINÆ, oval city coat-of-arms supported by lions rampant | DOMINE CONSERVA NOS IN PACE, view of city |
1727 taler coin

The cantons of the Old Swiss Confederacy used a currency system consisting of based on the old unit of the Schilling, with the Schilling divided into 4 Rappen or 12 Haller. The Taler was a large silver coin equivalent to 72 Schilling or 2 Gulden that came into use in the 16th century. The Batzen was an intermediate coin equivalent to 2 Schilling or 1/18 Gulden.

== Overview ==
Taler were minted in Zürich during the 16th to 18th centuries, with Talers, Doppeltaler and halbe Taler, first minted in Zürich in the 16th century. First dated coins are Guilders minted in 1512. Taler coins consisted of 27 to 28 grams of silver, with a diameter of 39 to 43 mm.

The currency used in the 18th century was a thaler worth 1/11 of a Cologne mark and a gulden worth 1/22 of a Cologne mark. The Gulden was divided into 40 schilling or 60 kreuzer. The French silver écu was valued at 2 1/2 gulden.

The French écu was equivalent to 4 francs of the Helvetic Republic, and afterwards to 4 Zürich franken. This 4-franken or 40-batzen Neutaler was minted during 1806–1848.

In the late 18th century, silver coins were issued in denominations of 5, 10 and 20 Schilling, 1/2 and 1 Taler. Zürich also minted gold half-ducats and ducats. A ten ducats coin minted in 1724, with a weight of 34.8 grams in gold, is in possession of the Swiss National Museum.

== See also ==
- Baden thaler
