= Francks =

Francks is a surname. Notable people with the surname include:

- Cree Summer Francks (born 1969), American voice actress and singer
- Don Francks (1932–2016), Canadian actor, musician, and singer
- Rainbow Sun Francks (born 1979), Canadian actor and songwriter

== See also ==
- Franck (disambiguation)
- Franks (surname)
