= Solothurn thaler =

Currency of the Swiss canton of Solothurn

Viertel Duplone
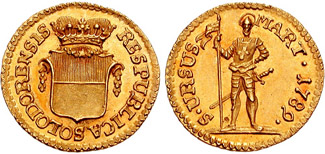
First side of the image: RESPUBLICA SOLODORENSIS, crowned coat-of-arms
Second side of the image: S URSUS MART 1789, military Saint Ursus standing facing, holding banner.
AV - 1,92 g

The Solothurn Thaler was a coin equivalent to the French silver écu issued by the Swiss canton of Solothurn until 1798. It contained 26.67 g fine silver and was valued at 4 livres.

The currency of Solothurn was the livre (later franc or frank), divided into 10 batzen or 40 kreuzer.

The écu was also equivalent to 4 Franken of the Helvetic Republic, and afterwards to 4 Solothurn franken.

== Coins ==
In the late 18th century, billon coins were issued in denominations of 1 Vierer, 1, 2 and 4 Kreuzer, together with silver 10 and 20 Kreuzer, 10 and 20 Batzen, and gold 1/4, 1/2, 1 and 2 Duplone.
