= Berne thaler =

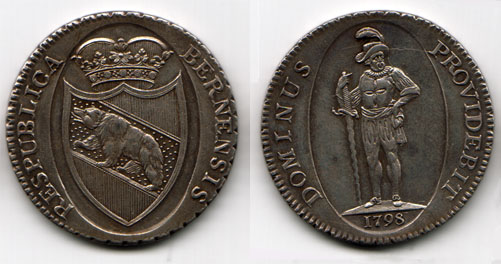
Thaler. 1798.

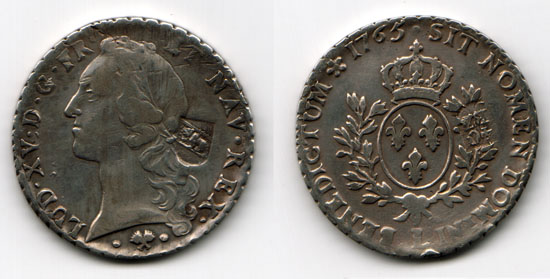
French ecu stamped 40 BZ (batzen) for use in Bern

The Berne thaler was a coin equivalent to the French silver écu (German: laubthaler) issued by the Swiss Canton of Bern. It contained 26.67 g fine silver and was valued at 4 livres.

The currency of Bern was the livre (later, franc or frank), divided into 10 batzen or 40 kreuzer.

The laubthaler or écu was also equivalent to 4 franken of the Helvetic Republic, and afterwards to 4 Berne franken and 4 Vaud francs.

== Coins ==
In the late 18th century, billon coins were issued in denominations of 1/2 and 1 Kreuzer, 1/2 and 1 Batzen, together with silver 10 and 20 Kreuzer, 1/4, 1/2 and 1 Thaler, and gold 1/2, 1 and 2 Duplone. The 1/2 Kreuzer coins were inscribed as 1 Vierer. Additionally, French écus were counterstamped '40 BZ' (40 batzen) in Bern for local use.
