= Basel thaler =

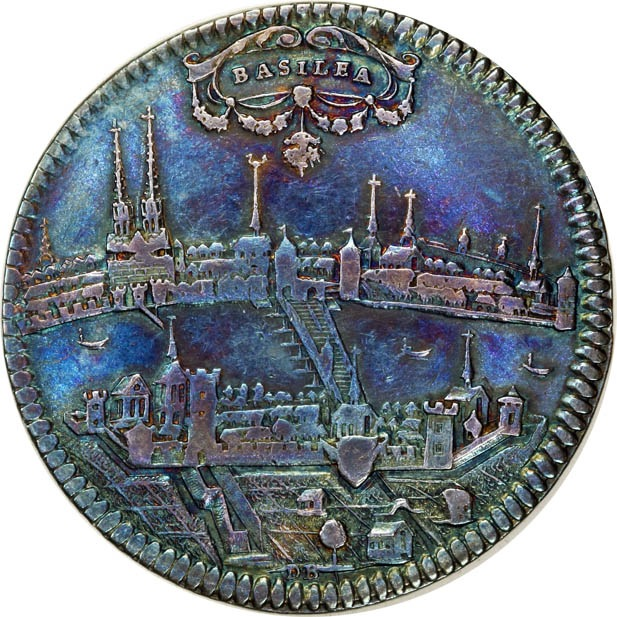
Thaler
BASILEA, city view of Basel, value (1/2).	Crozier with floral decoration in circle of eight shields.
ca. 1640 - AR - 14.07 g

The Basel Thaler was a currency denomination worth 3 livres or 30 batzen used by the Swiss Canton of Basel until 1798. It was used by both the Canton and the Bishopric of Basel.

Basel's basic currency unit was the livre (later franc or frank), divided into 10 batzen or 40 kreuzer. It was worth 1/4th the French silver écu or 6.67 g fine silver.

The French écu was also equivalent to 4 Franken of the Helvetic Republic, and afterwards to 4 Basel franken.

== Coins ==
The first Thalers were issued between 1542 and 1552 by the city of Basel, together with 1/2 Thaler between 1542 and 1548. In the 17th and 18th centuries, the canton issued 1/4, 1/2, 1 and 2 Thaler coins, with 1/3 Thaler only struck between 1764 and 1766. In the late 18th century, the canton issued billon coins for 1/2, 1 and 3 Batzen, silver pieces of 1/6, 1/3, 1/2 and 1 Thaler, and gold Duplone and 1 and 2 Gulden.

The Bistum (Bishopric) issued silver Thaler for the first time in 1596. Bishop Wilhelm Rinck von Baldenstein (1608–1628) issued 1/4 Thaler in 1623, 1/2 Thaler in 1625 and 1 Thaler in 1624 and 1625. Bishop Johann Konrad II (1705–1737) issued 1/4 Thaler in 1717 and 1 Thaler in 1716. These were the last Thaler-denominated coins issued by the Bishopric of Basel. However, the Bishopric continued to issue billon coins, in denominations of 1/2 and 1 Batzen, and silver coins for 12 and 24 Kreuzer (3 and 6 Batzen).
