= Baden thaler =

Coin

The Thaler was a coin issued by Baden of varying equivalents to its currency, the South German gulden, each of 60 kreuzer. Beginning in 1690, the Reichsthaler specie coin of 25.984 g fine silver was issued for 2 gulden. After 1754, the Conventionsthaler of 23.3856 g fine silver was issued for 2.4 gulden (2 gulden, 24 kreuzer). Starting in the 19th, century the Kronenthaler of 25.71 g fine silver was issued for 2.7 gulden (2 gulden, 42 kreuzer); the French silver écu also started being accepted for 2.8 gulden (2 gulden, 48 kreuzer). After 1837, the doppelthaler, which was worth two Prussian thalers, was issued for 3 1/2 gulden. From 1857 to 1871, the Vereinsthaler was issued for 1 3/4 gulden.

== See also ==
- South German gulden
- Reichsthaler
- Conventionsthaler
- Kronenthaler
- Écu § Silver écu of 1726
- Prussian thaler
- Vereinsthaler
