= St. Gallen thaler =

Currency of St. Gallen until 1798

The Thaler was a currency denomination worth 2 Gulden used by St. Gallen until 1798.

St. Gallen's basic currency unit was the Gulden, each of 60 Kreuzer or 240 Pfennig. Its value was the same as the South German gulden. The French silver écu was worth 2.8 Gulden or 2 Gulden, 48 kreuzer.

The French écu was equal to 4 Frank of the Helvetian Republic as well as 4 St. Gallen Frank. Coins were issued by both the Abbey of St. Gall and the City.

== Coins ==
In the late 18th century, the Abbey coinage consisted of billon 1 Pfennig, 1, 2, 4, 5 and 6 Kreuzer, together with silver 10, 12, 15, 20 and 30 Kreuzer, 1 Gulden, 1/2 and 1 Thaler. The city coinage consisted of billon 2, 3, 6 and 15 Kreuzer coins.
