= Rappen =

Coin

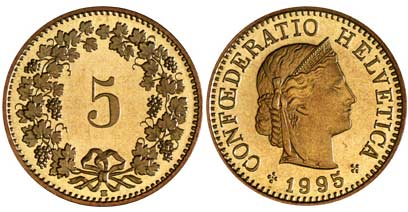
The Swiss 5-Rappen coin

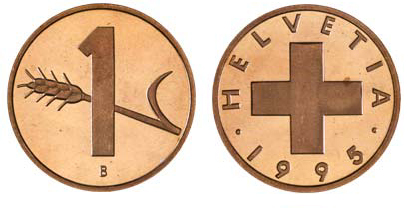
The Swiss 1-Rappen coin has not been valid since 2007.

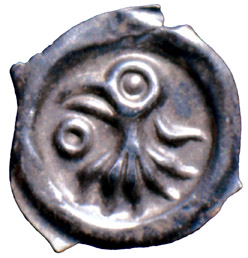
Rappenpfennig from Freiburg im Breisgau, ca. 1290

A Rappen (pl. Rappen) originally was a variant of the medieval Pfennig ("penny") coin common to the Alemannic German regions of Alsace, northern Switzerland and south-western Germany. As with other German pennies, its half-piece was a Haller, the smallest piece which was struck.

Today, one-hundredth of a Swiss franc is still officially called a Rappen in German and Swiss German and a rap in Romansh. In French-speaking Switzerland, the modern Swiss currency-unit is called a centime (pl. centimes) and in Italian-speaking Switzerland, a centesimo (pl. centesimi), respectively. Centime(s) is also used internationally or in languages other than the Swiss national languages.

== Name ==
The origin of the term can be traced back to the Rappenpfennig, a form of the penny minted in Freiburg im Breisgau in the 13th century featuring an eagle, which later on was interpreted to depict a raven (German Rabe; the word is thus a cognate of its German homophone Rappen referring to a "raven"-black horse).

Due to the coin's wide circulation in the Upper Rhine region, it was adopted as standard currency in the so-called Rappenbund ("Rappen federation"), a union of regional mints formed in 1399 that included the Bishop of Basel and most of the region's larger cities. After the dissolution of the Rappenbund in 1584, a number of Swiss states continued to mint rappen within their territories, where they remained in local use until the middle of the 19th century.

== History ==
In 1798, when Switzerland was politically unified by the French under the Helvetic Republic, a unified currency was needed to standardise the widely differing currencies of the so-far sovereign Swiss states (up to then about 860 different coins had been used in Switzerland). A new Swiss franc based on the Berne thaler was introduced, in which 10 rappen made one batzen, 10 of which in turn formed one franc. This unified coinage was struck for five years only, until the end of the Helvetic Republic in 1803. However, many of the newly independent Cantons of Switzerland now minted their own, localised versions of decimal franc, batzen, and rappen currencies, until Switzerland was again politically unified in 1848 and the modern Swiss franc was issued to replace the local currencies in the Federal Coinage Act of 1850.

Two-rappen coins were struck until 1974 and withdrawn from circulation in 1978, one-rappen coins continued to be struck until 2006 and were demonetised in 2007, long after they had fallen out of daily use. The 5, 10, and 20 rappen coins are currently in circulation, while the füfzgi is officially not a 50 rappen coin, but a half-franc coin (see Coins of the Swiss franc).

== See also ==
- Vreneli
- Coins of the Swiss franc
- Withdrawal of low-denomination coins
