= Franconian =

Franconian may refer to:

- anything related to Franconia (German Franken), a historic region in Germany, now part of Bavaria, Thuringia and Baden-Württemberg
- East Franconian German, a dialect spoken in Franconia
- Franconian languages
- Franconian (stage), a stage in North American stratigraphy named for the Franconia Formation, near the town of Franconia in eastern Minnesota
- Franconian notation, mensural musical notation as formulated by Franco of Cologne in the 13th century

== See also ==
- Name of the Franks
- Frankish (disambiguation)
- Franks (disambiguation)
