= Schaffhausen frank =

The Frank was the currency of the Swiss canton of Schaffhausen between 1798 and 1850. It was subdivided into 10 Batzen, each of 4 Kreuzer. It was worth 1/4th the French silver écu or 6.67 g fine silver.

== History ==
The Frank was the currency of the Helvetian Republic from 1798, replacing the Thaler in Schaffhausen. The Helvetian Republic ceased issuing coins in 1803. Schaffhausen issued coins between 1808 and 1809. In 1850, the Swiss franc was introduced, with 1 Schaffhausen Frank = 1.4597 Swiss francs.

== Coins ==
Billon coins were issued in denominations of 1 Kreuzer, 1/2 and 1 Batzen.
