= Geneva franc =

Swiss currency

20 francs
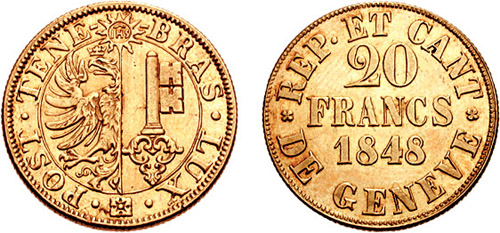
First side of the image: Coat of arms.
POST TENEBRAS LUX
Second side of the image: REP• ET CANT/DE GENEVE`
20/FRANCS/1848
AV, 7.62 g, 6h

The franc was the currency of the Swiss canton of Geneva between 1839 and 1850. It was subdivided into 100 centimes.

== History ==
The franc replaced the thaler in 1839. It was equal to the French franc. In 1850, the Swiss franc was introduced, with 1 Swiss franc = 1 Geneva franc.

== Coins ==
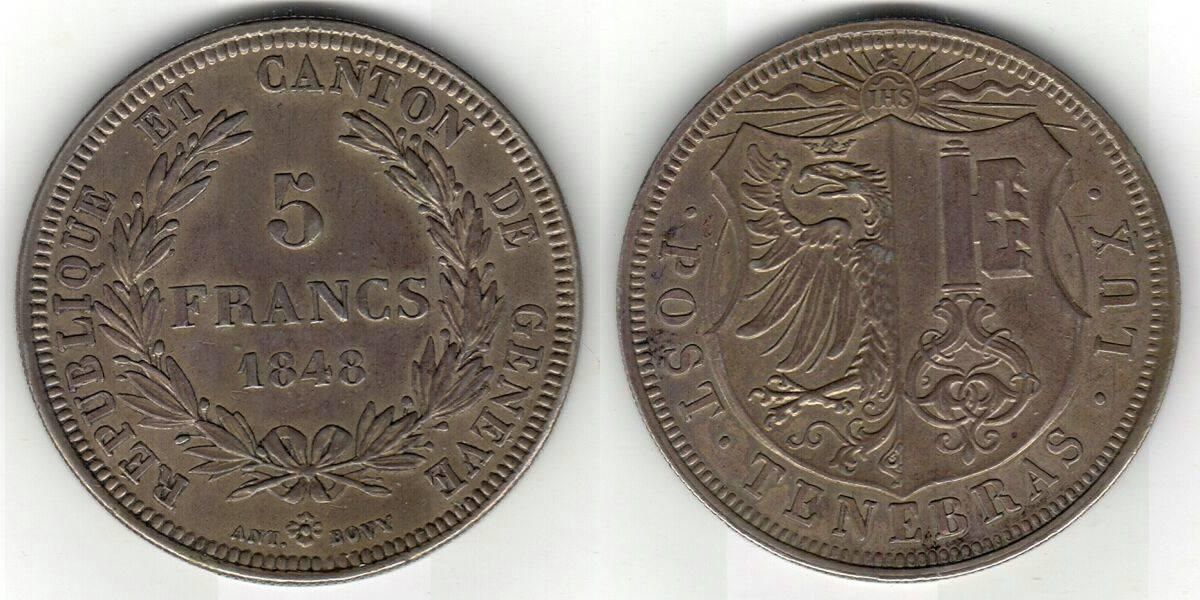
GE 5Francs (1848)

Billon coins were issued in denominations of 1, 2, 4, 5, 10 and 25 centimes. Small numbers of coins were struck in silver for 5 and 10 francs and in gold for 10 and 20 francs.
