= Appenzell frank =

The Frank was the currency of the Swiss canton of Appenzell Ausserrhoden between 1798 and 1850. It was subdivided into 10 Batzen, each of 4 Kreuzer or 16 Pfenning. It was worth 1/4th the French silver écu or 6.67 g fine silver.

== History ==
The Frank was the currency of the Helvetian Republic from 1798. The Helvetian Republic ceased issuing coins in 1803. Appenzell issued coins between 1808 and 1816. In 1850, the Swiss franc was introduced, with 1 Appenzell Frank = 1.4597 Swiss francs.

== Coins ==
Copper 1 pfenning coins were issued, together with billon 1 Kreuzer, 1/2 and 1 Batzen and silver coins for 1/2, 1, 2 and 4 Franken.
