= Uri frank =

Currency of Uri, Switzerland (1798-1850)

The Frank was the currency of the Swiss canton of Uri between 1798 and 1850. It was subdivided into 10 Batzen, each of 10 Rappen. It was worth 1/4th the French silver écu or 6.67 g fine silver.

== History ==
The Frank was the currency of the Helvetian Republic from 1798. The Helvetian Republic ceased issuing coins in 1803. Uri issued coins in 1811. In 1850, the Swiss franc was introduced, with 1 Uri Frank = 1.4597 Swiss francs.

== Coins ==
Billon coins were issued in denominations of 1 Rappen, 1/2 and 1 Batzen, with silver coins for 2 and 4 Batzen.
