= Luzern gulden =

The gulden was the currency of the Swiss canton of Luzern until 1798. It was subdivided into 40 schilling, each of 3 rappen or 6 angster. Coins were also issued denominated in kreuzer and batzen. The French silver écu was equivalent to 3 gulden.

The French écu was also equivalent to 4 Franken of the Helvetic Republic, and afterwards to 4 Luzern franken.

== Coins ==
In the late 18th century, copper coins were issued for 1 angster and 1 rappen, together with billon 1 schilling, 1/2 and 1 batzen. Silver coins were issued in denominations of 5 and 10 schilling, 20 and 40 kreuzer, and 20 and 40 batzen.
