= Unterwalden frank =

The Frank was the currency of the Swiss canton of Unterwalden between 1798 and 1850. It was subdivided into 10 Batzen. It was worth 1/4th the French silver écu or 6.67 g fine silver.

== History ==
The Frank was the currency of the Helvetian Republic from 1798. The Helvetian Republic ceased issuing coins in 1803. Nidwalden issued coins in 1811 and Obwalden issued coins in 1812. In 1850, the Swiss franc was introduced, with 1 Unterwalden Frank = 1.4597 Swiss francs.

== Coins ==
Both half cantons issued billon coins in denominations of 1/2 and 1 Batzen, together with silver coins for 5 Batzen.
