= Schwyz frank =

The Frank was the currency of the Swiss canton of Schwyz between 1798 and 1850. It was subdivided into 10 Batzen, each of 10 Rappen (also spelled Rapen) or 20 Angster. It was worth 1/4th the French silver écu or 6.67 g fine silver.

== History ==
The Frank was the currency of the Helvetian Republic from 1798, replacing the Gulden in Schwyz. The Helvetian Republic ceased issuing coins in 1803. Schwyz issued coins between 1810 and 1846. In 1850, the Swiss franc was introduced, with 1 Schwyz Frank = 1.4597 Swiss francs.

== Coins ==
Copper coins were issued in denominations of 1 Angster and 1 Rappen, with billon coins for 2 Rappen, 2/3 and 2 Batzen, and silver 4 Batzen.
