= Kronenthaler =

Silver coin of the Austrian Netherlands

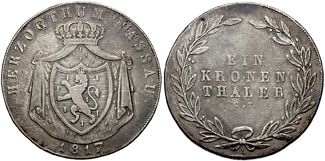
Nassau Kronenthaler, 1817

The Kronenthaler was a silver coin first issued in 1755 in the Austrian Netherlands (see Austrian Netherlands Kronenthaler) and which became a popular trade coin in early 19th century Europe. Most examples show the bust of the Austrian ruler on the obverse and three or four crowns on the reverse, hence the name which means "crown thaler" (also Brabanter and crocione (Italian).

== History ==
The kronenthaler was initially issued with the same weight as the French écu at around 29.5 grams, but with a value of 54 sols (stuivers) or 2.7 gulden while the écu had a value of 56 sols (stuivers) or 2.8 gulden. French écus with 27 grams of fine silver can be theoretically melted and reissued into kronenthalers with 27x27/28 = 26 grams of fine silver, matching the silver content of the Reichsthaler of the Leipzig convention.

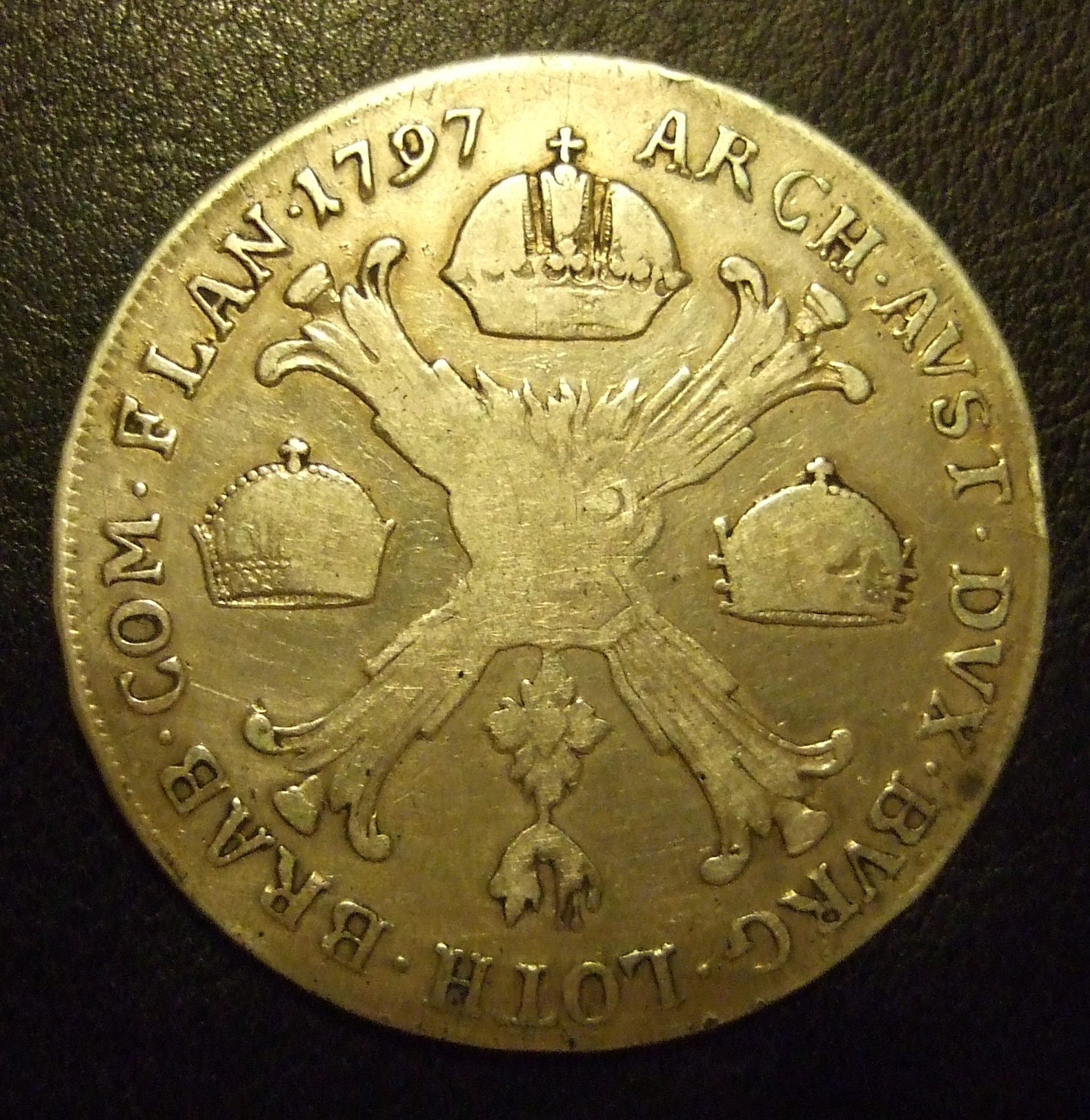
Kronenthaler with 3 crowns in 1797 - Franciscus II

A deliberate minting of below-standard French écus, however, also resulted in a decreased silver content for the Kronenthaler. The French annexation of the Southern Netherlands in 1794 resulted in the conversion of Kronenthalers and 6-livre écus into new French francs at the rate of 1 franc = 1.0125 livre tournois = 0.16875 écu = 4.5 grams fine silver. This implies a fine silver equivalence of 26 2/3 grams per écu, 25 5/7 grams per kronenthaler, and 9 11/21 or 9.52 grams per gulden.

This reduced-value Belgian gulden doomed the introduction of the 9.61-gram Dutch Gulden as standard currency of the United Kingdom of the Netherlands in 1815 as the conversion of 2.7-guilder Kronenthalers into 2.7 Dutch guilders was guaranteed. At about the same time from 1807-1837, several German states (e.g., Bavaria, Baden, Württemberg) engaged in a competitive depreciation of the South German gulden by choosing to mint 2.7-gulden Kronenthalers (with 9.52 grams of silver per gulden) rather than the 2.4-gulden Conventionsthaler (with 9.74 grams of silver per gulden). The kronenthaler was minted prolifically in the 19th century precisely because it yielded the issuer the maximum amount of guilders for a fixed quantity of coined silver.

The situation was resolved in the Netherlands by reducing the fine silver content of the Dutch gulden to 9.45 grams, and in the Southern German states by adopting a new parity of 1 gulden = 4/7 Prussian thaler = 1/24.5 Cologne mark =9.545 grams of silver as part of the German Customs Union and currency union of 1837. The kronenthaler was thus retired in favor of the new Dutch and South German guilders.

The kronenthaler was also the most favorable medium of exchange in Switzerland prior to the adoption of the Swiss franc in 1850. French écus accepted at 4 Swiss livres imply a kronenthaler valuation of 4x27/28 livres = 3.86 livres. Instead the écu de Brabant is accepted at a higher rate of 3.9 livres. The rate of conversion to the new Swiss currency was 5 5/7 Swiss francs per kronenthaler.
