= Basel frank =

The Basel frank (German Franken, French franc) was the currency of the Swiss canton of Basel between 1798 and 1850. It was worth 1/4th the French silver écu or 6.67 g fine silver.

== History ==
The Frank was the currency of the Helvetian Republic from 1798, replacing the Thaler in Basel. The Helvetian Republic ceased issuing coins in 1803. Basel issued coins between 1805 and 1826, with the Frank subdivided into 10 Batzen, each of 10 Rappen. In 1850, the Swiss franc was introduced, with 1 Basel Frank = 1.4597 Swiss francs.

== Coins ==
Bullion coins were issued in denominations of 1, 2 and 5 Rappen, 1/2 and 1 Batzen, with silver coins for 3 and 5 Batzen. All bore the arms of the canton.
