= Vaud franc =

Swiss currency (1798–1850)

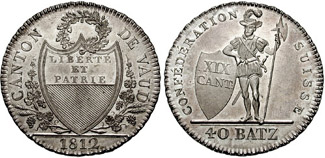
40 batz
| Civic coat of arms. In exergue date (1812) | Soldier with pike and shield. In exergue value |
AR (29.43 g)

The franc was the currency of the Swiss canton of Vaud between 1798 and 1850. It was subdivided into 10 batz, each of 10 rappes. The usual price unit was the Batz. It was worth 1/4th the French silver écu or 6.67 g fine silver.

== History ==
The Frank was the currency of the Helvetian Republic from 1798. The Helvetian Republic ceased issuing coins in 1803. Vaud issued coins between 1804 and 1834. In 1850, the Swiss franc was introduced, with an exchange rate of 1 Vaud franc = 1.4597 Swiss francs.

== Coins ==
Billon coins were issued in denominations of 1 and 2 1/2 rappes, 1/2 and 1 batz, with silver coins for 5, 10, 20 and 40 batz and 1 franc.
