= St. Gallen frank =

The Frank was the currency of the Swiss canton of St. Gallen between 1798 and 1850. It was subdivided into 10 Batzen, each of 4 Kreuzer or 16 Pfennig. It was worth 1/4th the French silver écu or 6.67 g fine silver.

== History ==
The Frank was the currency of the Helvetian Republic from 1798, replacing the Thaler in St. Gallen. The Helvetian Republic ceased issuing coins in 1803. St. Gallen issued coins between 1807 and 1817. In 1850, the Swiss franc was introduced, with 1 St. Gallen Frank = 1.4597 Swiss francs.

== Coins ==
Billon coins were issued in denominations of 1 Pfennig, 1/2 and 1 Kreuzer, and 1/2, 1 and 1 1/2 Batzen, with the 1½ Batzen denominated as 6 Kreuzer. Silver coins were struck for 5 Batzen, also denominated as 1/2 Frank.
