= Luzern frank =

Currency of the Swiss canton of Luzern, 1798–1850

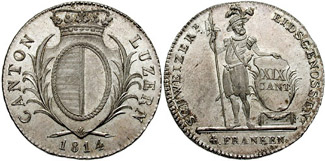
4 Franken coin issued in 1814

The Frank was the currency of the Swiss canton of Luzern between 1798 and 1850. It was subdivided into 10 Batzen, each of 10 Rappen or 20 Angster. It was worth 1/4th the French silver écu or 6.67 g fine silver.

The Frank was the currency of the Helvetic Republic from 1798, replacing the Gulden in Luzern. The Helvetian Republic ceased issuing coins in 1803 and Luzern once again issued coins its own coins, from 1803 to 1846.

Copper coins were issued in denominations of 1 Angster and 1 Rappen, together with billon 1/2 and 1 Batzen, silver 2 1/2, 5 and 10 Batzen and 4 Franken and gold 10 and 20 Franken.

In 1850, the Swiss franc was introduced, with 1 Luzern Frank = 1.4597 Swiss francs.
