= Francke =

Francke is a German surname. Notable people with the surname include:

- August Hermann Francke (1663–1727), German Protestant theologian
- Arne Francke (1904–1973), Swedish horse rider
- Donald E. Francke (1910–1978), American pharmacist, editor and author
- Gloria Niemeyer Francke (1922–2008), American pharmacist and science writer
- Klaus Francke (1936–2020), German politician
- Kuno Francke (1855–1930), educator and historian
- Malcolm Francke (born 1939), Australian cricketer
- Master Francke (c.1380–1440), German painter
- Michael Francke (1946–1989), Director of the Oregon Department of Corrections
- Paul Francke (architect) (c.1537–1615), German architect and master builder
- Paul Francke (footballer) (died in World War I), German football player and founder member of Bayern Munich
- Paul Francke (geologist) (1897–1957), German geologist
- Paul Francke (musician) (born 1979), American musician
- Rend al-Rahim Francke (born 1949), Iraqi political activist and ambassador to the United States
- Rudolf Francke, German First World War flying ace
- Stewart Francke (1958–2025), American singer-songwriter

== See also ==
- Franke
- Francken
- Franck (disambiguation)
