= Glarus frank =

The Frank was the currency of the Swiss canton of Glarus between 1798 and 1850. It was subdivided into 100 Rappen, with the Schilling worth 3 Rappen. It was worth 1/4th the French silver écu or 6.67 g fine silver.

== History ==
The Frank was the currency of the Helvetian Republic from 1798. The Helvetian Republic ceased issuing coins in 1803. Glarus issued coins between 1806 and 1814. In 1850, the Swiss franc was introduced, with 1 Glarus Frank = 1.4597 Swiss francs.

== Coins ==
Billon coins were issued 1806–1814 in denominations of 1 and 3 Schilling, with silver coins for 15 Schilling. All coins were also denominated in Rappen.
