= Schwyz gulden =

The Gulden was the currency of the Swiss canton of Schwyz until 1798. It was subdivided into 40 Schilling, each of 3 Rappen or 6 Angster. Coins were also issued denominated in Groschen. The French silver écu was equivalent to 2 1/2 Gulden.

The French écu was also equivalent to 4 Franken of the Helvetic Republic, and afterwards to 4 Schwyz franken.

== Coins ==
In the late 18th century, copper coins were issued for 1 Angster and 1 Rappen, together with billon 1 Rappen and 1 Groschen. Silver coins were issued in denominations of 5 and 10 Schilling, 1/2 and 1 Gulden.
