= Thurgau frank =

The Frank was the currency of the Swiss canton of Thurgau between 1798 and 1803. It was subdivided into 10 Batzen, each of 4 Kreuzer. It was worth 1/4th the French silver écu or 6.67 g fine silver.

== History ==
The Frank was the currency of the Helvetian Republic from 1798. The Helvetian Republic ceased issuing coins in 1803. Thurgau issued coins between 1808 and 1809. In 1850, the Swiss franc was introduced, with 1 Thurgau Frank = 1.4597 Swiss francs.

But the main currency in the Canton of Thurgau between 1803 and 1850 was the South German Gulden. It was subdivided into 15 Batzen or 60 Kreuzer. In 1850, the Swiss franc was introduced, with 1 Gulden = 2.12 Swiss francs.

== Coins ==
Billon coins were issued in denominations of 1/2 and 1 Kreuzer, 1/2 and 1 Batzen, together with silver coins for 5 Batzen.
