= Aargau frank =

Former currency in Europe (1798–1850)

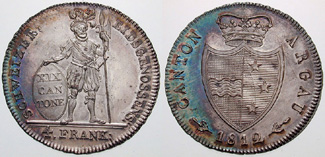
Aargau 4 Franken
Knight resting with shield and halberd. Around SCHWEIZER EIDSGENOSSENS	CANTON AARGAU - Crowned arms
AG, 29.36 g

The Frank was the currency of the Swiss canton of Aargau between 1798 and 1850. It was subdivided into 10 Batzen, each of 4 Kreuzer or 10 Rappen. It was worth 1/4th the French silver écu or 6.67 g fine silver.

== History ==
The Frank was the currency of the Helvetian Republic from 1798. The Helvetian Republic ceased issuing coins in 1803. Aargau issued coins between 1805 and 1831. In 1850, the Swiss franc was introduced, with 1 Aargau Frank = 1.4597 Swiss francs.

== Coins ==
Billon coins were issued in denominations of 1, 2, 2 1/2 and 5 Rappen, 1/2 and 1 Batzen, with silver coins for 5, 10 and 20 Batzen and 4 Frank. The 2 1/2 Rappen was also denominated as 1 Kreuzer.
