= Zürich frank =

Swiss currency

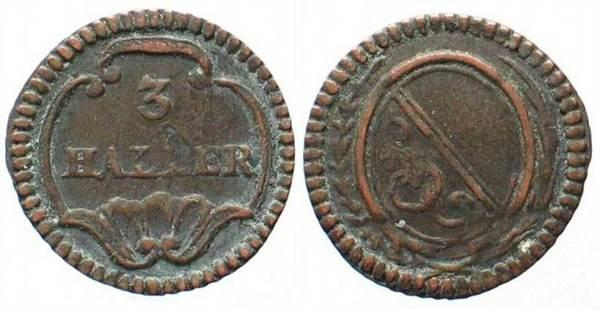
3 heller.

The Frank was the currency of the Swiss canton of Zürich between 1806 and 1850. It was subdivided into 10 Batzen, each of 10 Rappen, with 3 Heller to the Rappen and 4 Rappen to the Schilling. It was worth 1/4th the French silver écu or 6.67 g fine silver.

== History ==
The Franc was the currency of the Helvetic Republic from 1798. The Helvetic Republic ceased issuing coins in 1803, Zürich again minted its own coins between 1806 and 1848. In 1850, the Swiss franc was introduced, with 1 Zürich franc = 1.4597 Swiss francs.

== Coins ==
Billon coins were issued in denominations of 1 and 2 Rappen, with the 1 Rappen initially denominated as 3 Haller. Silver coins were struck for 10 Schillinge, 8, 10, 20 and 40 Batzen.
