= Solothurn frank =

European currency

The Frank was the currency of the Swiss canton of Solothurn between 1798 and 1850. It was subdivided into 10 Batzen, each of 4 Kreuzer or 10 Rappen. It was worth 1/4th the French silver écu or 6.67 g fine silver.

== History ==
The Frank was the currency of the Helvetian Republic from 1798. The Helvetian Republic ceased issuing coins in 1803. Solothurn issued coins between 1805 and 1830. In 1850, the Swiss franc was introduced, with 1 Solothurn Frank = 1.4597 Swiss francs.

== Coins ==
Billon coins were issued in denominations of 1, 2 1/2 and 5 Rappen, and 1 Batzen, with silver coins for 5 Batzen, 1 and 4 Franken, and gold 8, 16 and 32 Franken. The 2 1/2 Rappen was also denominated as 1 Kreuzer.
