= Graubünden frank =

Currency in Switzerland

The Frank was the currency of the Swiss canton of Graubünden between 1798 and 1850. It was subdivided into 10 Batzen, each of 6 Bluzger. It was worth 1/4th the French silver écu or 6.67 g fine silver.

== History ==
The Frank was the currency of the Helvetian Republic from 1798. The Helvetian Republic ceased issuing coins in 1803. Graubünden issued coins between 1807 and 1842. In 1850, the Swiss franc was introduced, with 1 Graubünden Frank = 1.4597 Swiss francs.

== Coins ==
Billon coins were issued in denominations of 1/6, 1/2 and 1 Batzen, with silver coins for 5 and 10 Batzen.
