= Franck =

Franck can refer to:

== People ==
- Franck (name)

== Other ==
- Franck, Argentina, town in Santa Fe Province, Argentina
- Franck (company), Croatian coffee and snacks company
- Franck (crater), Lunar crater named after James Franck

== See also ==
- Franc (disambiguation)
- Franks
- Frank (disambiguation)
- Frankie (disambiguation)
- Frankel, Frankl
