= Franck (name) =

Franck is both a surname and a masculine given name. Notable people with the name include:

== Surname ==
- Alfons Franck, Belgian chess master
- César Franck (1822–1890), Belgian composer of the Romantic era
- Eduard Franck (1817–1893), German composer of the Romantic era
- George Franck (1918–2011), American football player
- Dom George Franck, (c. 1690–1760), French composer and organist
- Hans Ulrich Franck, (1603–1675), German painter, draftsman and printmaker
- Harry A. Franck (1881–1962), American travel writer
- Helga Franck (1933-1963), German actress
- James Franck (1882–1964), German physicist and Nobel laureate
- Johann Franck (1618–1677), German poet and hymn-writer
- Johnny Franck (born 1990), American musician
- Julia Franck (born 1970), German writer
- Kaj Franck (1911–1989), Finnish designer
- Kasper Franck (1543–1584), German theologian
- Kevin Franck (born 1982), Belgian football player
- Louis Franck (disambiguation), multiple people
- Mathilde Franck (1866–1956), French aviator
- Melchior Franck (1579–1639), German composer of the very early Baroque era
- Mikko Franck (born 1979), Finnish conductor
- Nadja Franck (1867–1932), Finnish figure skater
- Richard Franck (1858–1938), German pianist, composer and teacher.
- Sebastian Franck (1499–c. 1543), German humanist and reformer
- Salomon or Salomo Franck (1659 – 1725), German lawyer, scientist, and poet associated with J. S. Bach
- Sven Franck, German-French politician

== Given name ==
- Franck de Almeida (born 1983), Brazilian marathon athlete
- Franck Amsallem (born 1961), French jazz pianist, arranger, composer and singer
- Franck Atsou (born 1978), Togolese footballer
- Frank Adisson (born 1969), French slalom canoer and Olympian
- Franck Avitabile (born 1971), French jazz pianist
- Franck Azzopardi (born 1970), French footballer
- Franck Badiou (born 1967), French sports shooter and Olympian
- Franck Barthe, French mathematician
- Franck Belot (born 1972), French rugby union player
- Franck Béria (born 1983), French footballer
- Franck Bernhard (born 1976), French footballer
- Franck Berrier (1984–2021), French footballer
- Franck Biancheri (1961–2012), French politician
- Franck Biancheri (born 1960), Monegasque businessman and politician
- Franck Boidin (born 1972), French fencer and Olympian
- Franck Boli (born 1993), Ivorian footballer
- Franck Bouyer (born 1974), French road bicycle racer
- Franck Dacquin (born 1965), French-Belgian actor best known for French voice of Bandit Heeler
- Franck David (born 1970), French sailor and Olympian
- Franck Delhem (1936–2020), Belgian fencer and Olympian
- Franck Dja Djédjé (born 1986), Ivorian footballer
- Franck Ducheix (born 1962), French fencer and Olympian
- Franck Dumas (born 1968), French footballer and manager
- Franck Dumoulin (born 1973), French pistol shooter and Olympian
- Franck Durix (born 1965), French footballer
- Franck Engonga (born 1993), Gabonese footballer
- Franck Esposito (born 1971), French swimmer and Olympian
- Franck Essomba (born 1987), Cameroonian footballer
- Franck Etoundi (born 1990), Cameroonian footballer
- Franck Fréon (born 1962), French motor racing driver
- Franck Fisseux (born 1985), French archer and Olympian
- Franck Gava (born 1970), French footballer
- Franck Gilard (born 1950), French politician
- Franck Goddio (born 1947), French archaeologist
- Franck Goldnadel (born 1969), French public servant and aerospace engineer
- Franck Grandel (born 1978), Guadeloupean footballer
- Franck R. Havenner (1882–1967), American politician
- Franck Histilloles (born 1973), French footballer
- Franck Iacono (born 1966), French swimmer and Olympian
- Franck Julien (born 1966), French businessman
- Franck Junillon (born 1978), French handballer and Olympian
- Franck Jurietti (born 1975), French footballer
- Franck Khalfoun (born 1968), French film director
- Franck Lagorce (born 1968), French motor racing driver
- Franck Lambert (born 1960), French sprint canoer and Olympian
- Franck Langolff (1949–2006), French composer and guitarist
- Franck Lavaud (1903–1986), Haitian military general and politician
- Franck Leboeuf (born 1968), French footballer
- Franck Lenormand (born 1931), French cyclist and Olympian
- Franck Madou (born 1987), Ivorian footballer
- Franck Mailleux (born 1985), French motor racing driver
- Franck Montagny (born 1978), French motor racing driver
- Franck Muller (born 1958), Swiss watchmaker
- Franck Perera (born 1984), French motor racing driver
- Franck Piccard (born 1965), French Alpine skier and Olympian
- Franck Pourcel (1913–2000), French conductor
- Franck Ribéry (born 1983), French footballer
- Franck Sauzée (born 1965), French footballer and manager
- Franck Tabanou (born 1989), French footballer
- Franck Tchaouna (born 2005), Chadian footballer
- Franck Thilliez (born 1973), French writer
- Franck Vandecasteele (born 1967), French footballer
- Franck Verzy (1961–2025), French high jumper
