= Nadja Franck =

Finnish figure skater (1867–1932)

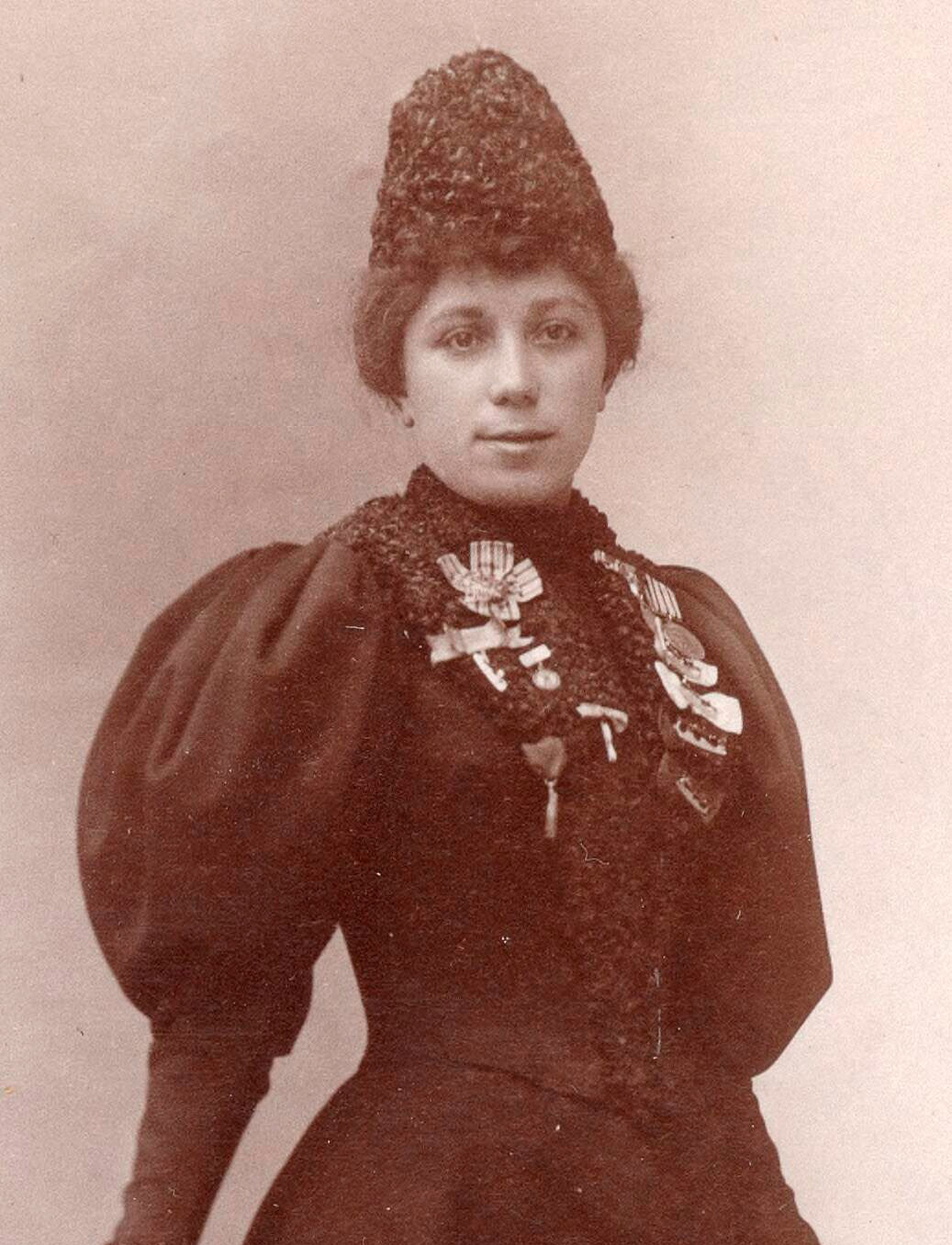
- Franck in the late 1800s

Personal information
- Full name: Nadeschda Franck
- Born: 15 April 1867 Helsinki, Finland
- Died: 7 January 1932 (aged 64) Helsinki

Figure skating career
- Country: Finland
- Discipline: Women's singles

Nadescha Franck, née Antipin (15 April 1867 – 7 January 1932) was a Finnish figure skater who competed in women's singles, skated professionally, and coached. She was the first Finnish woman to have an international sports career.

== Biography ==
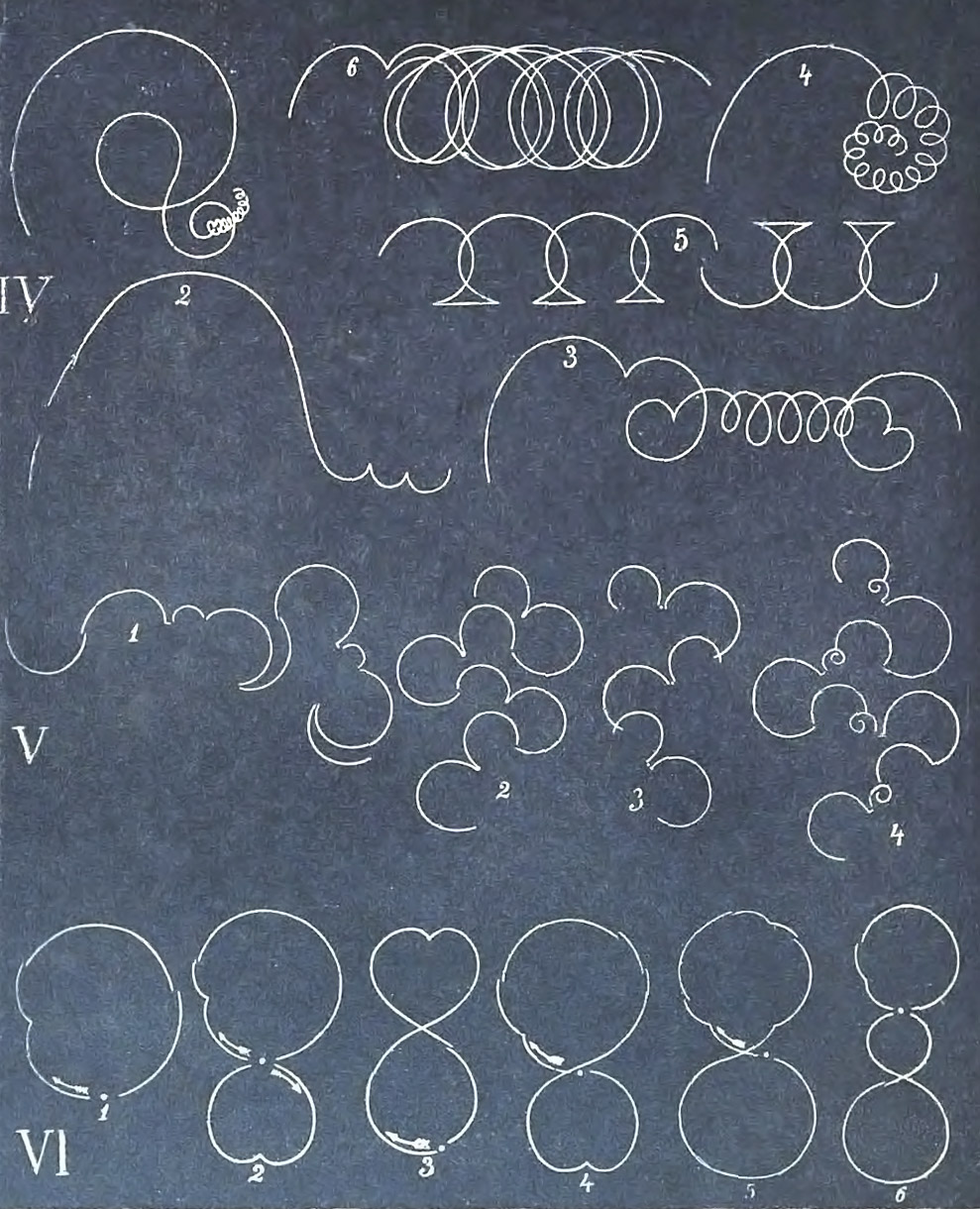
Special figures competed in Stockholm in 1889; Franck's figures are in the middle, marked "V"

Franck was born in Helsinki in 1867. She had two older siblings and a younger sister, and her parents were originally from Kyiv. She began skating as a child and particularly enjoyed creating combinations of steps and patterns on the ice. After seeing her skate, John Catani and Rudolf Sundgren, two of the best Finnish male skaters at the time, began to coach her. She began competing for Helsingfors Skridskoklubb in 1886, and in 1889, she competed at an international competition in Stockholm in front of 25,000 spectators. Three other women entered the competition, which Franck won.

She married a businessman from Pori, Gösta Franck, in 1888. They had a son born 23 October, 1889, and another born in 1891. Her husband died of pneumonia in 1892. After his death, Franck skated professionally, primarily outside of Finland in cities such as Paris; she also performed in England, Austria, Germany, Russia, Estonia, and the Nordic countries. During her performances, she frequently wore blue and white to represent the colors of Finland. In 1899, while performing in Stockholm, she received a jeweled brooch from Gustaf V.

She remarried to Väinö Sandqvistin in 1899 but continued to use her first married name when performing; she had her third son in 1901. In 1905, she converted from Orthodox Christianity to Lutheranism while staying in Saint Petersburg.

Her professional skating career continued until the 1910s. Contemporary reporting praised her grace, light movement, and her ability to skate figures. Les Patineur magazine wrote in 1895 that "It must be admitted that Nadja Franck is currently the European figure skating champion." Franck also coached, both while abroad and after her retirement from professional skating; she ran a school in Helsinki with Thyra Brandt. She continued skating into the 1920s. She died 7 January, 1932 in Helsinki.
