= Franks (surname) =

Franks is an Anglo-American surname, derived from the given name Frank and originally came from England and Germany. The name was in the early records, of the Virginia Colony, starting in the 1660s. The Jewish surname, Franks has also been found as early as the 17th century, in New York City.

People with the surname include:

- Abigail Franks (1696–1756), American colonist
- Dick Franks (1920–2008), American civil servant
- Augustus Wollaston Franks (1826–1897), English antiquarian
- Bobby Franks (1909–1924), murder victim
- Bubba Franks (born 1978), American footballer
- Camilla Franks (born 1976), Australian fashion designer
- Carl Franks (born 1960), American college football coach
- Cecil Franks (1935–2014), English politician
- David Franks (loyalist) (1720–1794), English colonist
- David Franks (aide-de-camp) (1740–1793), aide-de-camp of Benedict Arnold
- Feleipe Franks (born 1997), American football player
- Herman Franks (1914–2009), American baseball player
- Hermina Franks (1914–2010), American baseball player
- Jordan Franks (born 1996), American football player
- Lawrence Franks Jr. (1987–2020), American rapper known professionally as Huey
- Lynne Franks (born 1948), English public relations consultant
- Mary Anne Franks, American academic
- Michael Franks (musician) (born 1944), American singer-songwriter
- Michael Franks (athlete) (born 1963), American sprinter
- Mike Franks (tennis) (born 1936), American tennis player
- Oliver Shewell Franks (1905–1992), English philosopher
- Paul Franks (born 1979), English cricketer
- Philip Franks (born 1956), British actor
- Robert Franks, Disambiguation
- Bob Franks (1951–2010), American politician
- Stephen Franks (born 1950), New Zealand lawyer
- Tanya Franks (born 1967), English actress
- Tillman Franks (1920–2006), American bassist and songwriter
- Tim Franks (born 1968), British journalist
- Tommy Franks (born 1945), American general
- Trent Franks (born 1957), American politician
- Wilbur R. Franks (1901–1986), Canadian scientist
- William Sadler Franks (1851–1935), British astronomer
- Feleipe Franks, American Sportsman
- James Moyer Franks (born 1972), American singer and songwriter.

== See also ==
- Frank (surname)
- Frank (given name)
- Franks (disambiguation)
