= Duplone =

Former Swiss currency

The duplone was a currency used in various Swiss cantons in the late 1700s and early 1800s. Although there is a wide range of conversions due to the differing sizes and gold contents of different canton's duplones, 1 duplone is generally equal to 16 franken. This conversion is exact in both the cantons of Graubünden and Berne. Duplones had a consistent gold fineness of 0.900 (just below 22 karats) across Switzerland.
