= Écu =

Type of French coin

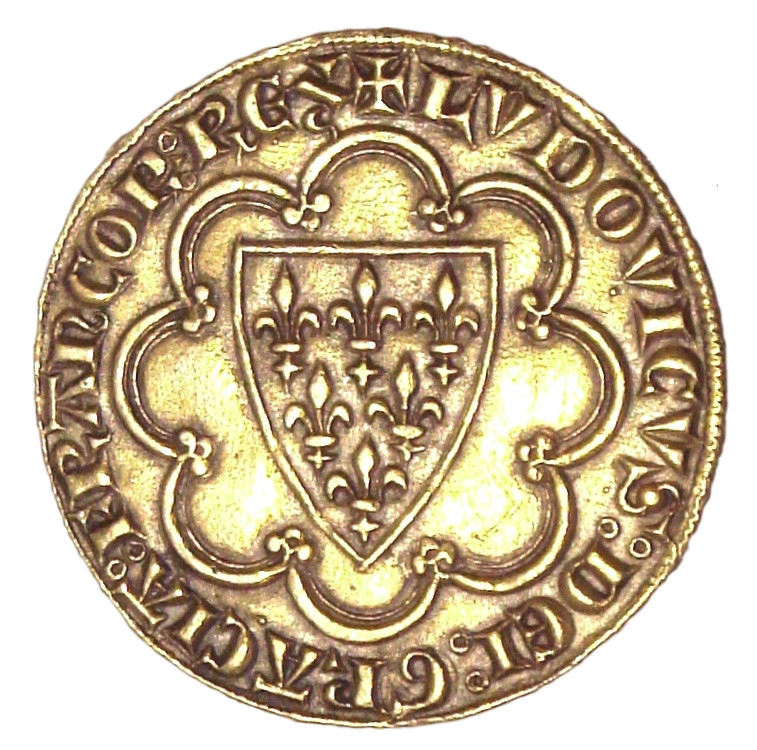
The first écu, issued by Louis IX of France, in 1266

The term écu (French pronunciation: [eky]) may refer to one of several French coins. The first écu was a gold coin (the écu d'or) minted during the reign of Louis IX of France, in 1266. The value of the écu varied considerably over time, and silver coins (known as écu d'argent) were also introduced.

Écu (from Latin scutum) means 'shield'. The coin was so called because its design included the coat of arms of France. The word is related to the Catalan escut, Italian scudo, or Portuguese and Castilian escudo. In English, the écu was often referred to as the crown, or the French crown in the eras of the English crown, British crown, and other crowns.

== History ==
=== Origin ===
When Louis IX took the throne, France still used small silver deniers (abbreviated d.), which had circulated since the time of Charlemagne to the exclusion of larger silver or gold coins. Over the years, French kings had granted numerous nobles and bishops the right to strike coins, and their "feudal" coinages competed with the royal coinage. Venice and Florence had already shown that there was demand for larger silver and gold coins and in 1266 Louis IX sought an advantage for the royal coinage by expanding it in these areas. His gold écu d'or showed a shield strewn with fleurs-de-lis, which was the coat of arms of the kings of France at the time. These coins were valued as if gold was worth 10 times as much as silver, an unrealistic ratio which Edward III of England had unsuccessfully tried to use. This mistaken valuation failed again; Louis IX's silver coins were a great success but his gold was not accepted at this rate, and his successor discontinued gold coinage.

=== Écu d'or ===
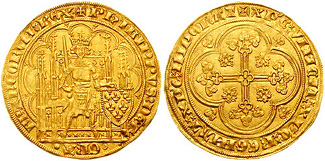
écu à la chaise of Philip VI

Philip IV reintroduced gold coinage to France in 1296 and began a sequence of extravagantly designed but rapidly changing types. These coins were generally named for the design on their obverse, and the écu à la chaise which Philip VI introduced in 1337 showed a shield with the coat of arms of the kings of France beside the seated king. Philip VI spent vast quantities of these coins subsidizing his allies in the Netherlands at the outset of the Hundred Years' War, and this coin was widely copied in the Netherlands.

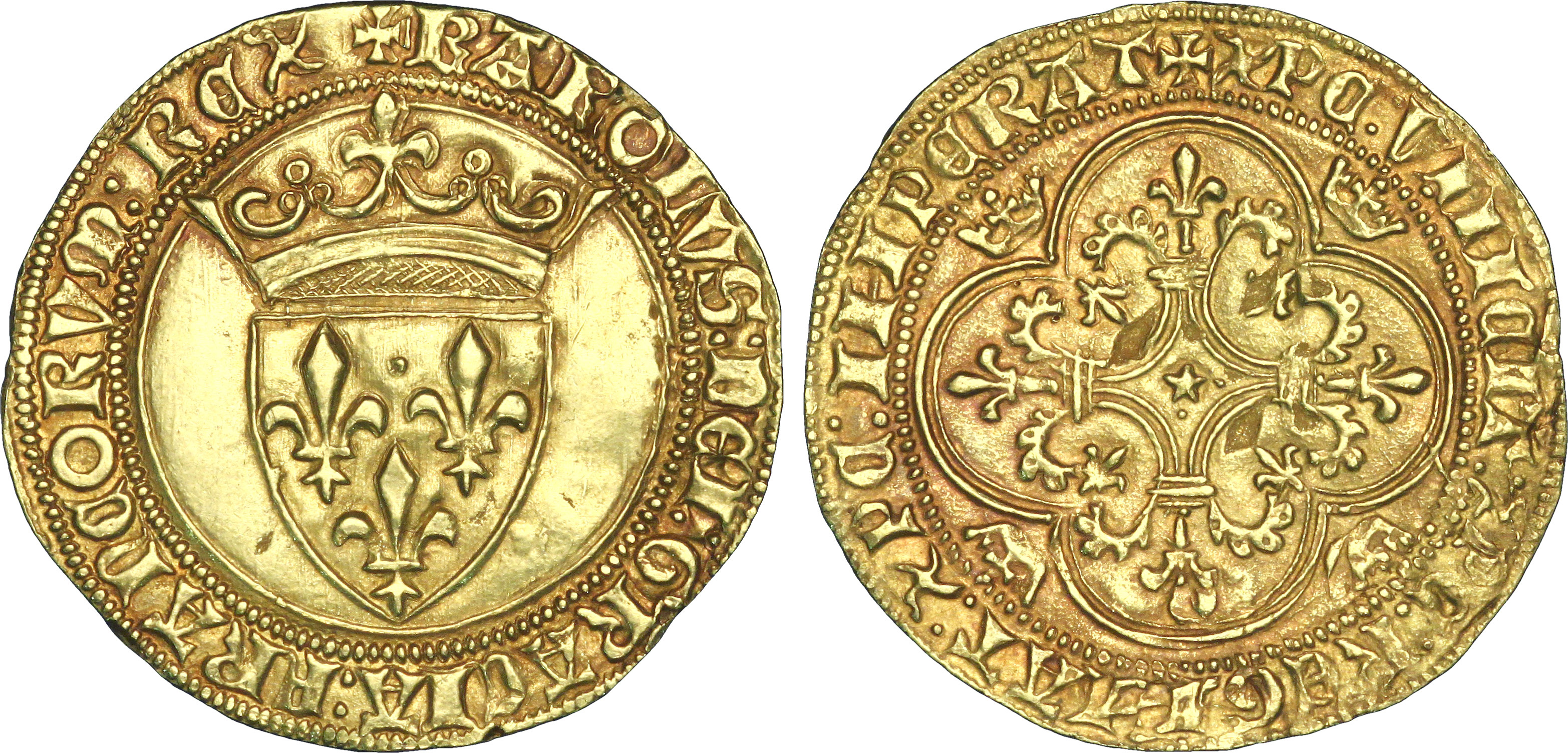
écu à la couronne of Charles VI

Charles VI ended the practice of frequently changing gold coin designs (but not that of tampering with their weight and value) with his écu à la couronne in 1385. This is again named after the shield on the obverse, which now has a crown above it and the modern coat of arms of the kings of France with three fleurs-de-lis. Charles VI's father had scored major gains against the English but had passed the cost on to his children. The government of the child Charles VI abandoned his father's sound money policy by replacing his gold franc à cheval. The new écu à la couronne weighed less than the franc but its value was increased from 1livre (₶.), i.e. 20 sous (abbr. s), for the franc to 22s. 6d. (i.e. 1₶. 2s. 6d.) for the écu. Not only was this a devaluation, but while the franc had been identified with its valuation of one livre the valuation of the écu à la couronne was subject to manipulation.

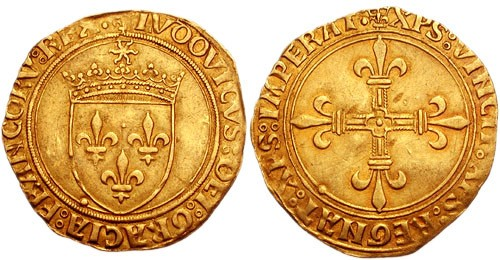
écu au soleil of Louis XII

In 1475, Louis XI created a variant of the écu à la couronne called an écu au soleil because the Sun now appeared above the shield. The process of devaluation continued. In 1515 the écu au soleil was valued at 36s. 9d., but this was increased to 45s. by 1547 even though its weight and fineness had been decreased in 1519. The écu design continued, essentially unchanged, on French gold coins until 1640 when the louis d'or replaced it.

In the second half of the 1500s gold and silver imported from Spanish America impacted the French economy, but the king of France was not getting much of the new wealth. He responded by revaluing the écu d'or in stages from 45s. in 1547 to 60s., i.e. 3₶., in 1577. This exacerbated the inflation caused by the increase in the supply of gold and silver, and the Estates General, which met at Blois in 1576, added to the public pressure to stop currency manipulation.

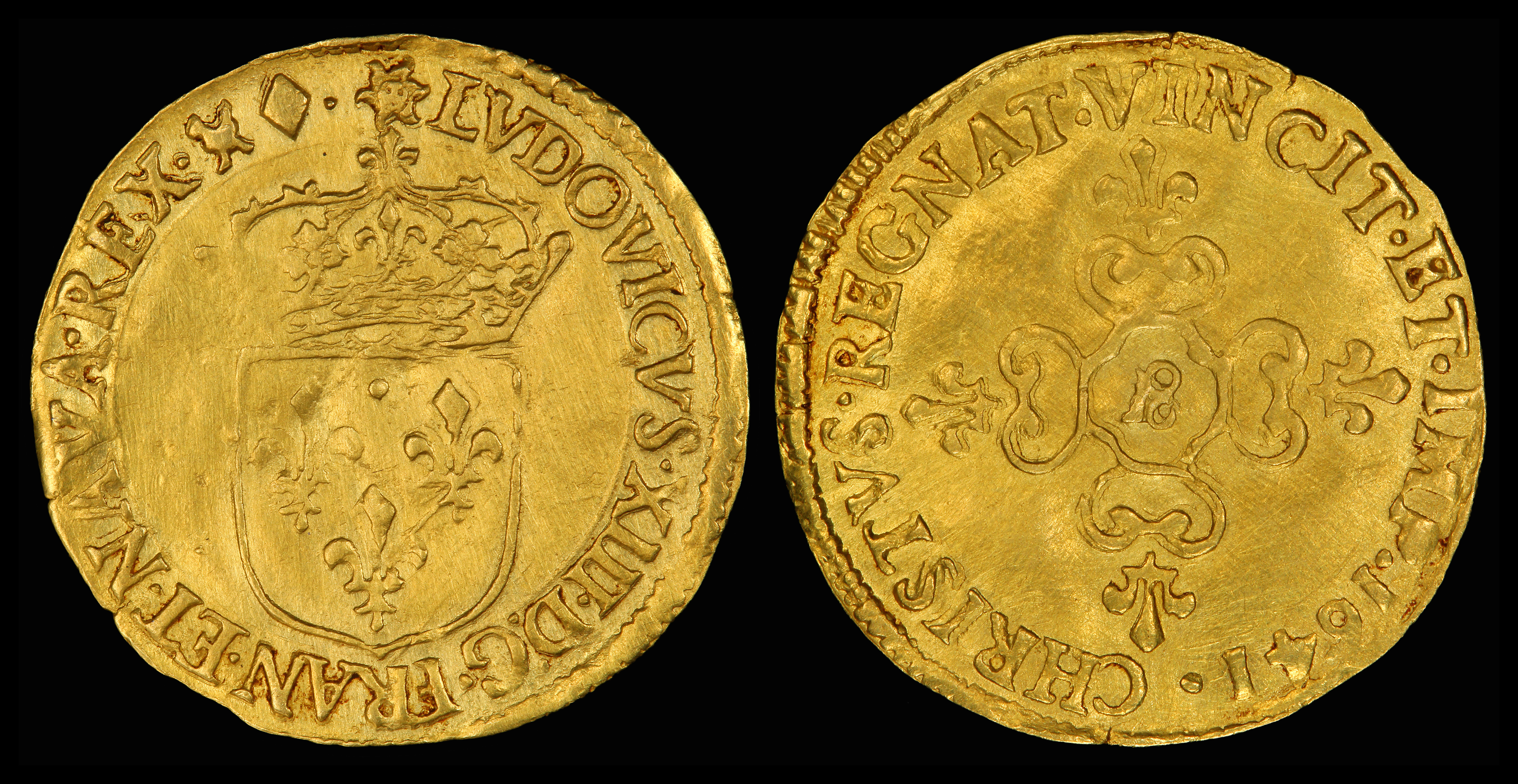
1641 Ecu d'or, reign of Louis XIII

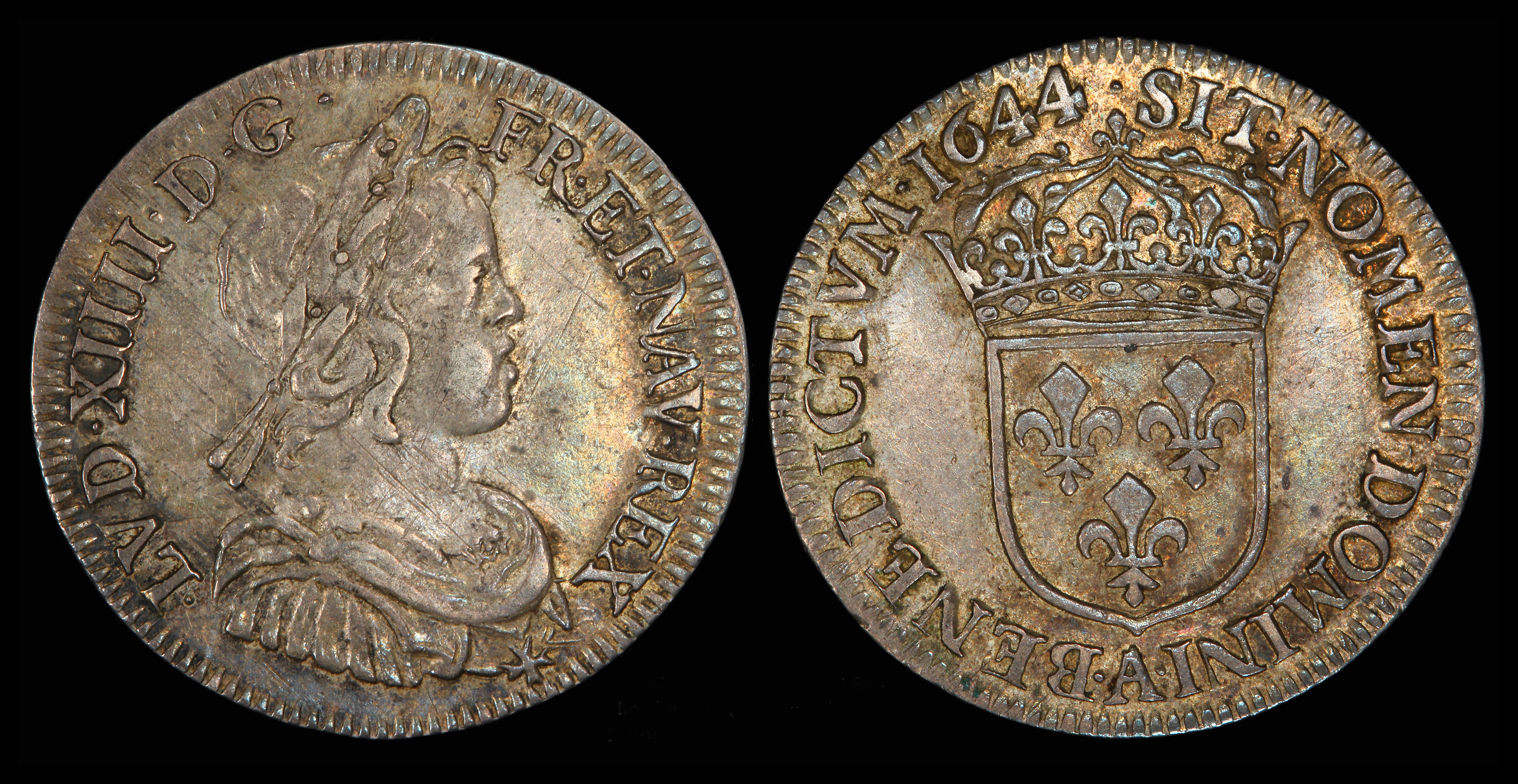
1644 quarter écu of Louis XIV

In 1577, Henri III agreed to stabilize the écu d'or at 3₶. and to adopt a new monetary system with prices quoted in écus. As part of this system, he introduced quarter and eighth écu coins struck in silver. The types of quarter and eighth écus d'argent paralleled those of the écu d'or, with the royal arms on the obverse and a cross on the reverse. For the first time in French history, these coins had a mark of value, with IIII or VIII placed on either side of the shield. Royal coins struck at mints in Navarre and Béarn added local heraldry to the fleurs-de-lis of France. Feudal coinages at Bouillon and Sedan, Château-Renaud, and Rethel also struck quarter écus, with their own arms replacing the royal arms. By the 17th century this écu d'or rose in value from 3₶. to more than 5₶., while the hammered silver quarter écu struck until 1646 rose from 15s. to 1₶.

=== Silver Louis or écu of 1641 ===
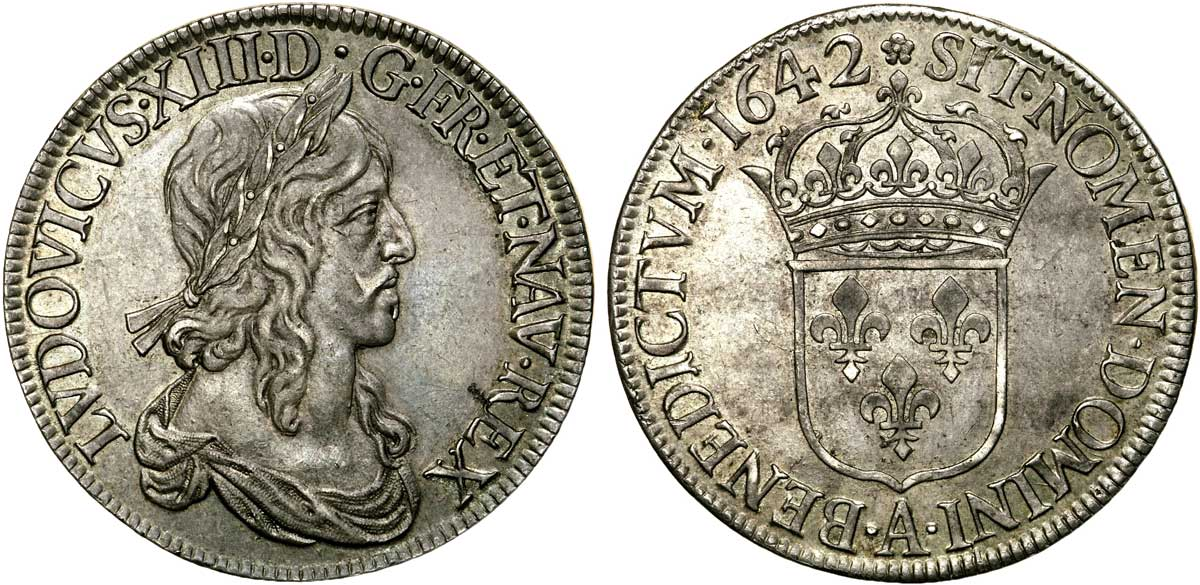
Louis d'argent of Louis XIII, 1642

The system introduced by Henri III still did not give France a coin which could compete with the thalers which were popular in Germany. Moreover, French coins were still made by hand, so precious metal could be illegally shaved from the edges of the coins before passing them on, and the écu d'or was made of 23 carat gold, which was not the international standard. Louis XIII fixed all this. He installed coin-making machinery in the Paris mint and replaced the écu d'or with the Louis d'or in 1640. In 1641 he introduced a thaler-sized silver coin originally called a Louis d'argent, issued at 9 to a French Mark of silver, 11/12 fine (24.93 g fine silver), and valued at three livres tournois – the same value in which the écu d'or was stabilized in 1577. This new 3₶. coin also came to be called an écu.

=== Silver écu of 1726 ===
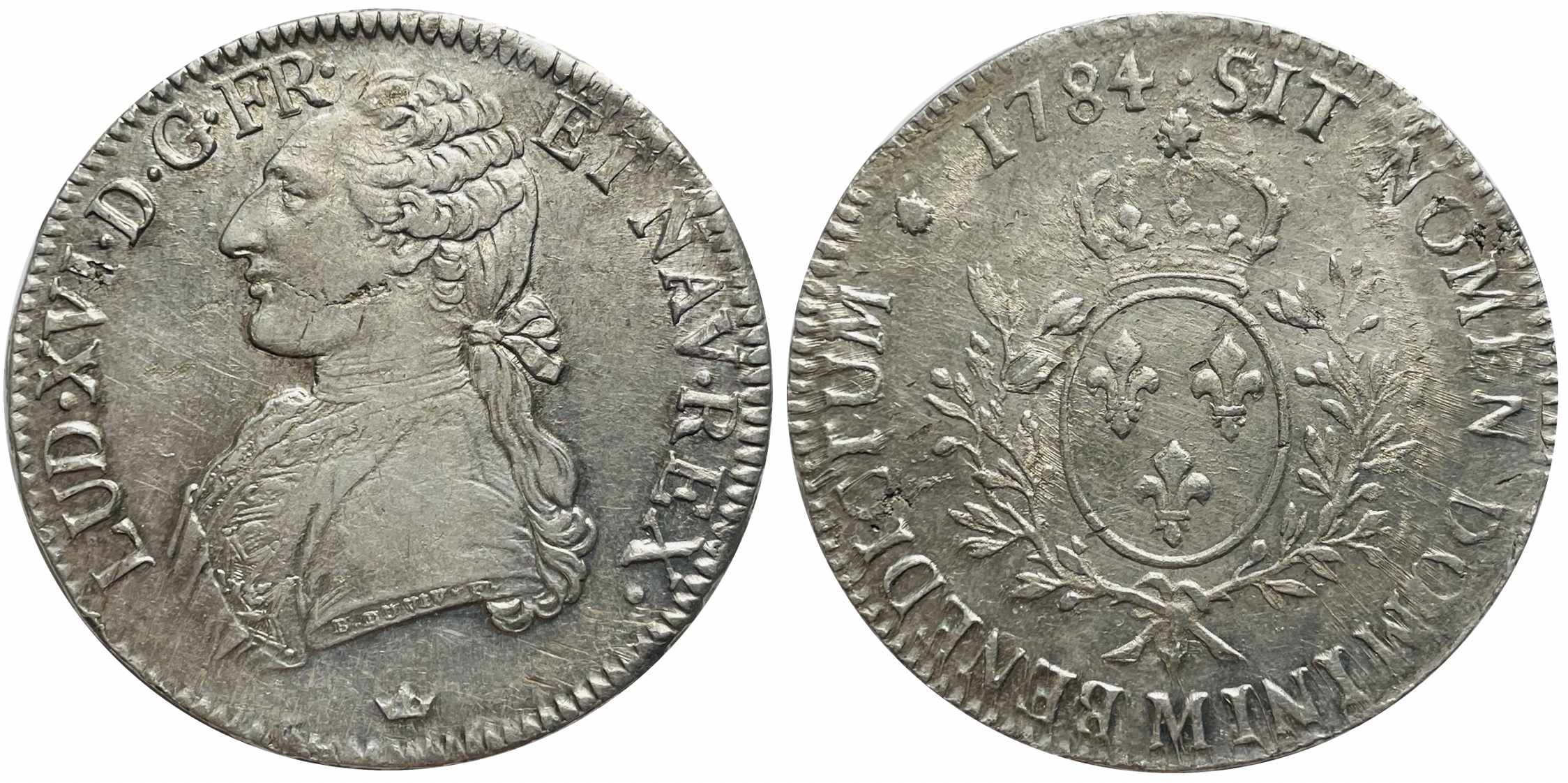
Silver coin: 1 écu - Louis XVI, 1784

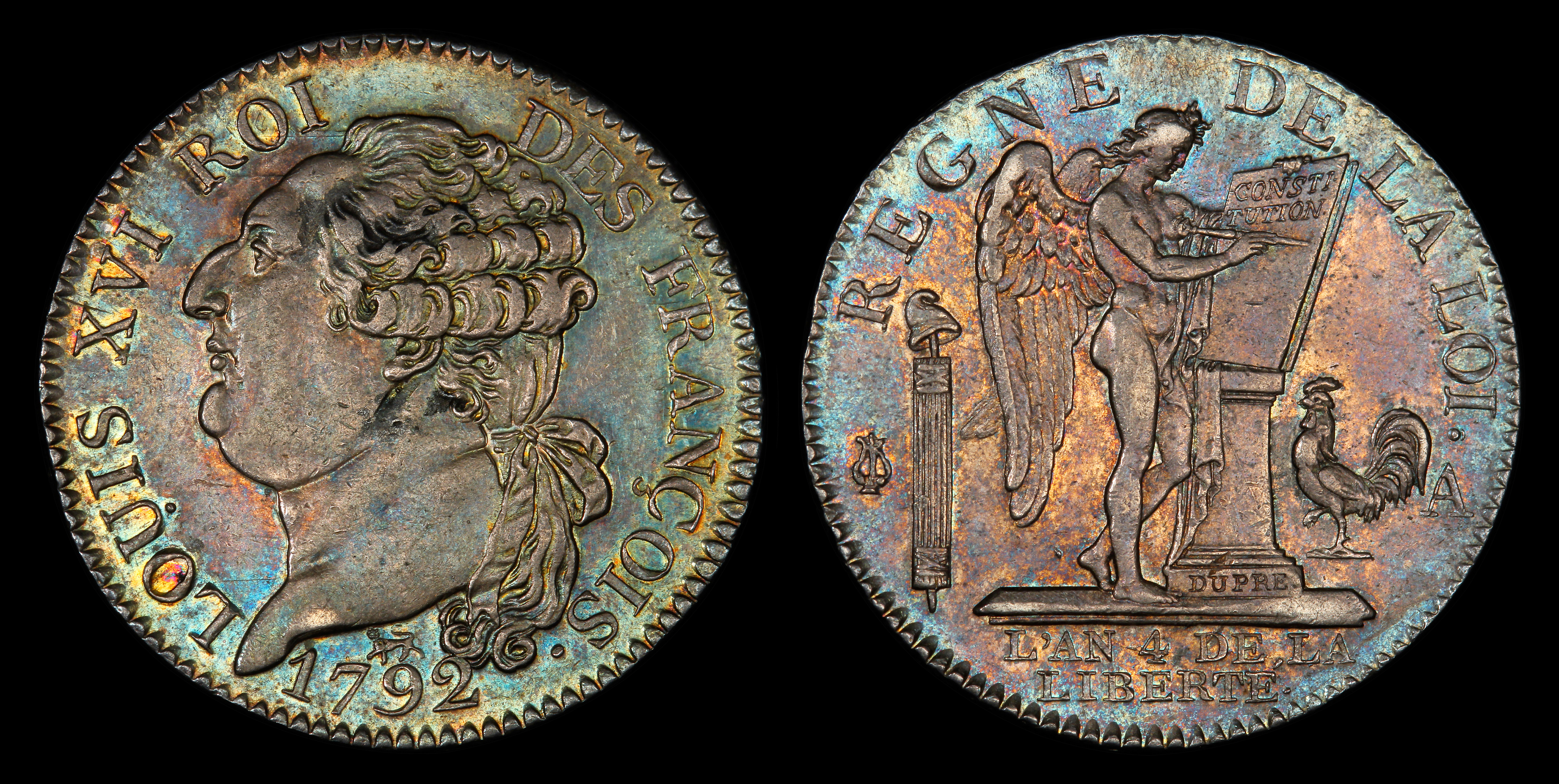
1792 half écu of Louis XVI

From 1690 to 1725 rates were unstable, resulting in the discontinuation of the Louis d'argent in favor of the new silver écu. In 1726 it was first issued at issued 8.3 to a French Mark of silver, 11/12 fine (or 27.03 g fine silver), and valued at 6₶. The silver écu was further broken down into a 1/8 value coin (huitième d'écu), a 1/4 value coin (the quart d'écu) and a 1/2 value coin (the demi-écu). All had the king's bust on the obverse and the royal coat of arms on the reverse.

This silver écu was known as the laubthaler in Germany. It circulated in Southern Germany at 2.8 South German gulden. In Switzerland it was worth four Berne livres or four francs of the Helvetic Republic. For more on the 17th- and 18th-century currency system, see Louis d'or, livre tournois and Italian scudo.

=== French Revolution ===
The silver écu disappeared during the French Revolution and was replaced by the franc at the rate of 6₶. = 6/1.0125 or 5.93 francs. At 4.5 g fine silver per franc this implied each écu contained only 26.66 g fine silver.

But the 5-franc silver coins minted throughout the 19th century were just a continuation of the old écus, and were often still called écu by French people. The écu, as it existed immediately before the French Revolution, was approximately equivalent (in terms of purchasing power) to 24 euro or 30 U.S. dollars in 2017.

=== European Economic Community / European Union ===
Prior to the introduction of the Euro, the term Ecu was seriously considered as the official name of the European currency.

== References in novels ==
The Count of Monte Cristo: "The speculators were the richer by eight hundred thousand écus." (page 179 in the Penguin Classics translation by Robin Buss)

Madame Bovary: "He had spent so much for repairs at Tostes, for madame's toilette, and for the moving, that the whole dowry, over three thousand écus, had slipped away in two years."
