= Religion in Switzerland =

Religion in Switzerland (age 15+, 2024) (Note: Since 2010, statistics of religious affiliation in Switzerland provided by the Swiss Federal Statistical Office are based on a national structural survey of 200,000 people aged 15 years and older (corresponding to 2.5% of the total resident population). Data are extrapolated to obtain statistical results for the whole population (aged 15 years and older). These results are estimates subject to some degree of uncertainty indicated by a confidence interval, but by merging samples (pooling) from several years it is possible to get more accurate results. Therefore, the figures of the structural survey may not be entirely comparable to data collection before 2010 based on census figures (counting every person living in Switzerland) or to annual official numbers of church members.)
1. Unaffiliated (36.8%)
2. Catholicism (30.0%)
3. Protestantism (18.7%)
4. Other Christians (6.00%)
5. Islam (6.00%)
6. Hinduism (0.60%)
7. Buddhism (0.50%)
8. Judaism (0.20%)
9. Other religions (0.20%)
10. Unknown (0.90%)

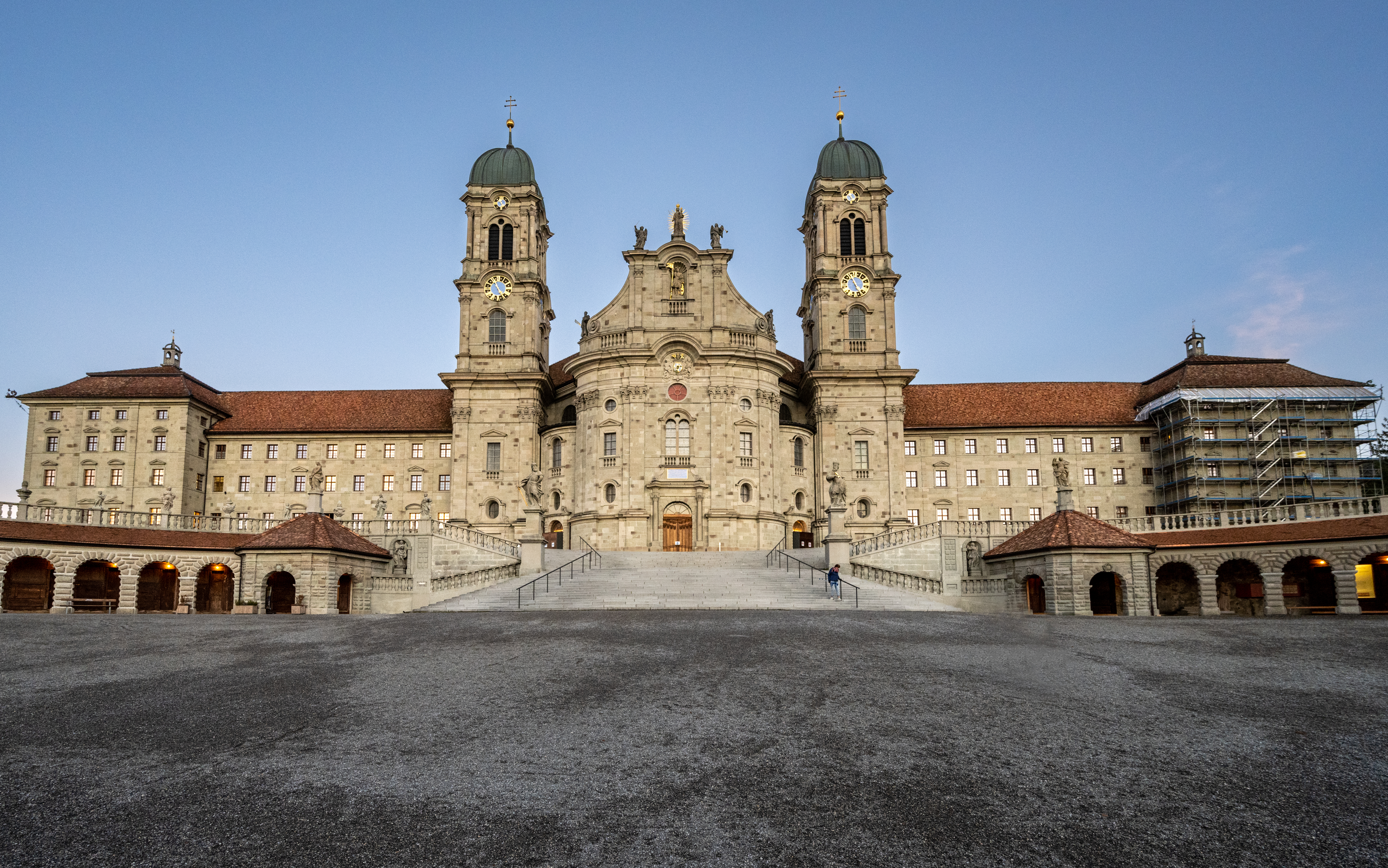
Church of Our Lady of the Hermits of the Einsiedeln Abbey, a monastery of the Catholic Benedictines in Einsiedeln, canton of Schwyz.

Religion in Switzerland is predominantly Christianity. According to the national survey of the Swiss Federal Statistical Office, in 2024, Christians accounted for 54.7% of the resident population (aged fifteen years and older), of whom 30% were Catholics, 18.7% were Swiss Protestants, and 6% were followers of other Christian denominations (about half Orthodox and half other Protestants). The proportion of Christians has declined significantly since 1980, when they constituted about 94% of the population; during the same timespan, unaffiliated Swiss residents have grown from about 4% to 36.8% of the population, and people professing non-Christian religions have grown from about 1% to 7.5% of the population. In 2020, according to church registers, 35.2% of the resident population were registered members of the country's Catholic Church, while 23.3% were registered members of the Protestant Church of Switzerland. (Note: Precise statistics about the membership of churches among the total population in Switzerland is only available for officially registered (and church tax paying) religious bodies, namely the Catholic Church in Switzerland and the Protestant Church of Switzerland (Landeskirchen).)

Christianity was adopted by the Gaulish (mostly Helvetii) and Germanic (mostly Alemanni) ancestors of the modern Swiss, respectively, between the 4th- and 5th-century late Roman domination the former, and between the 6th- and 7th-century Frankish domination the latter, abandoning their indigenous Gallo-Roman and Germanic paganisms. The Old Swiss Confederacy which began to emerge in the 13th century remained entirely Catholic until the 16th century, when it became one of the centres of the Protestant Reformation and a majority of the Swiss joined the Protestant movement of Calvinism. Conflicts, and even civil wars, between Protestants and Catholics persisted until the Sonderbund War in 1847, after which freedom of conscience was established by law — only for Christians. Legal discrimination against Jews and some restrictions against the Catholic Church persisted, respectively, until the late 19th century the former and the end of the 20th century the latter. In the early 20th century, Switzerland had an absolute majority of Protestants (about 60%) and a large population of Catholics (about 40%); since the late 20th century and throughout the 21st century, the religious composition of the country has changed significantly, with a rise of the irreligious population, a sharp decline of Protestantism to about two tenths of the population, and a less sharp decline of Catholicism to about three tenths of the population.

Switzerland has no state religion, though most of its cantons (except for Geneva and Neuchâtel) recognise official churches (Landeskirchen), in all cases Catholic and Swiss Protestant, and in some cantons also the Old Catholic Church and Jewish congregations. These churches are financed by taxation of their adherents.

== Demographics ==
=== Census statistics, 1900–2020 ===
Religious affiliations in Switzerland, census/structural survey 1900–2022*
	Census data											Structural survey		
Religion	1900	1910	1920	1930	1940	1950	1960	1970	1980	1990	2000	2010	2020	2023
Christianity	99.4	98.7	98.4	98.3	98.0	97.8	98.8	97.5	93.7	89.2	80.5	71.8	61.2	55.9
—Catholicism	41.6	42.5	40.9	41.0	40.4	41.5	45.4	46.7	46.2	46.2	42.3	38.4	33.8	30.7
—Swiss Protestantism	57.8	56.2	57.5	57.3	57.6	56.3	52.7	48.8	45.3	39.6	33.9	27.8	21.8	19.5
—Other Christians	–	–	–	–	–	–	0.7	2.0	2.2	3.4	4.3	5.6	5.6	5.8
Islam	–	–	–	–	–	–	–	0.2	0.7	1.6	3.6	4.9	5.4	6.0
Judaism	–	0.5	0.5	0.4	0.5	0.4	0.4	0.4	0.3	0.2	0.2	0.3	0.2	0.2
Other religion	0.6	0.9	1.1	1.2	1.5	1.7	0.1	0.1	0.2	0.3	0.7	1.2	1.2	1.3
No religion	–	–	–	–	–	–	0.5	1.2	3.9	7.5	11.4	20.6	30.9	35.6
Not stated	–	–	–	–	–	–	0.2	0.4	1.2	1.1	3.6	1.1	1.1	0.9
Population	3,315,443	3,753,293	3,880,320	4,066,400	4,265,703	4,714,992	5,429,061	4,575,416	4,950,821	5,495,018	5,868,572	6,587,556	7,187,715	
*1900–1960: total population (of any age) counted. 1970–2000: total population (age 15+) counted. Starting from 2010: extrapolated to the total population (age 15+).

=== Line chart of the trends, 1900–2020 ===
Census/structural survey's statistics 1900–2020:

View source data.
Catholicism
No religion
Swiss Protestantism
Other Christians
Islam
Other religion
Judaism

=== Religion by cantons ===
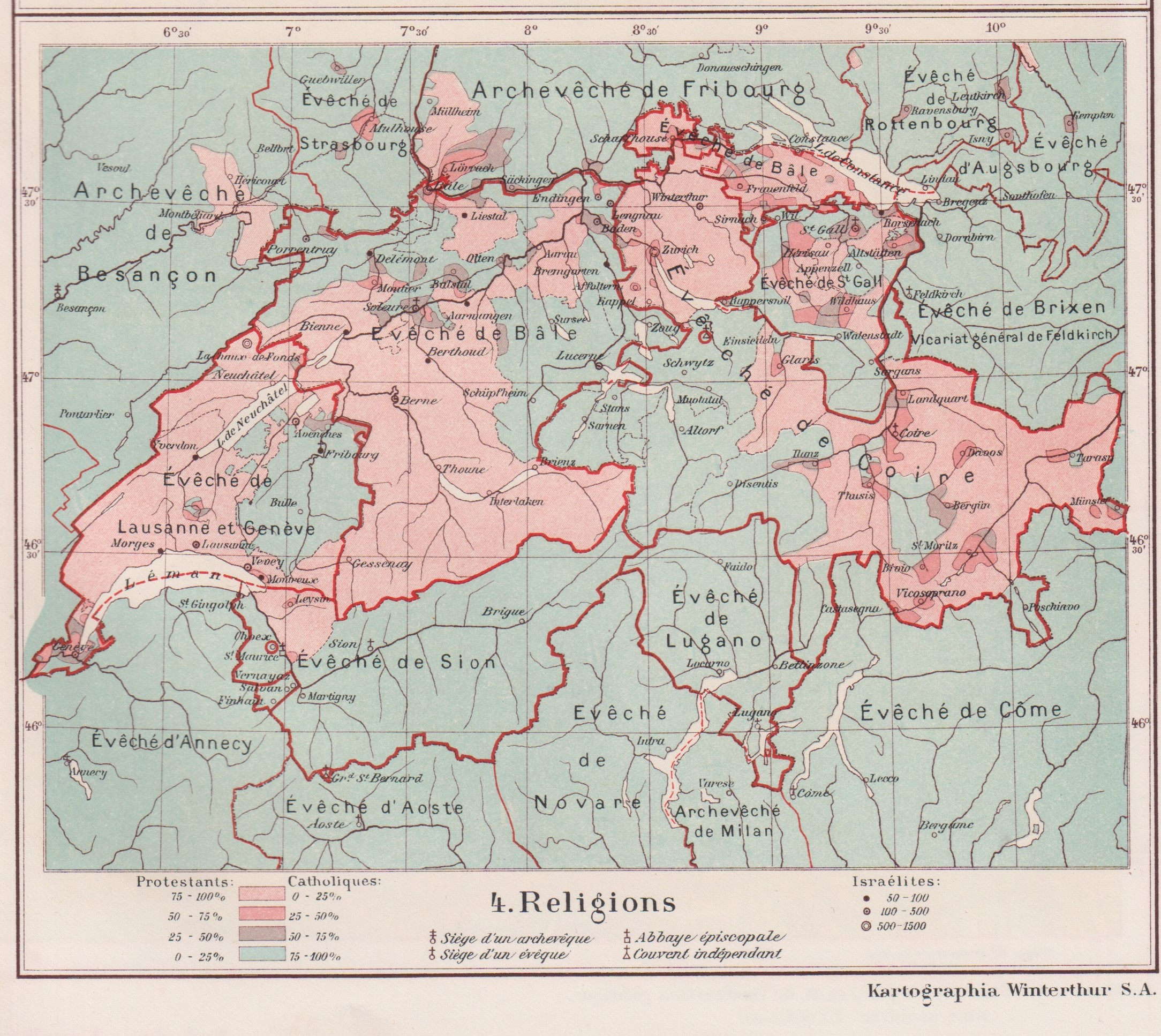
Religions in Switzerland by geographic areas in the early 20th century. Page from a school atlas in the collection of the Jewish Museum of Switzerland.

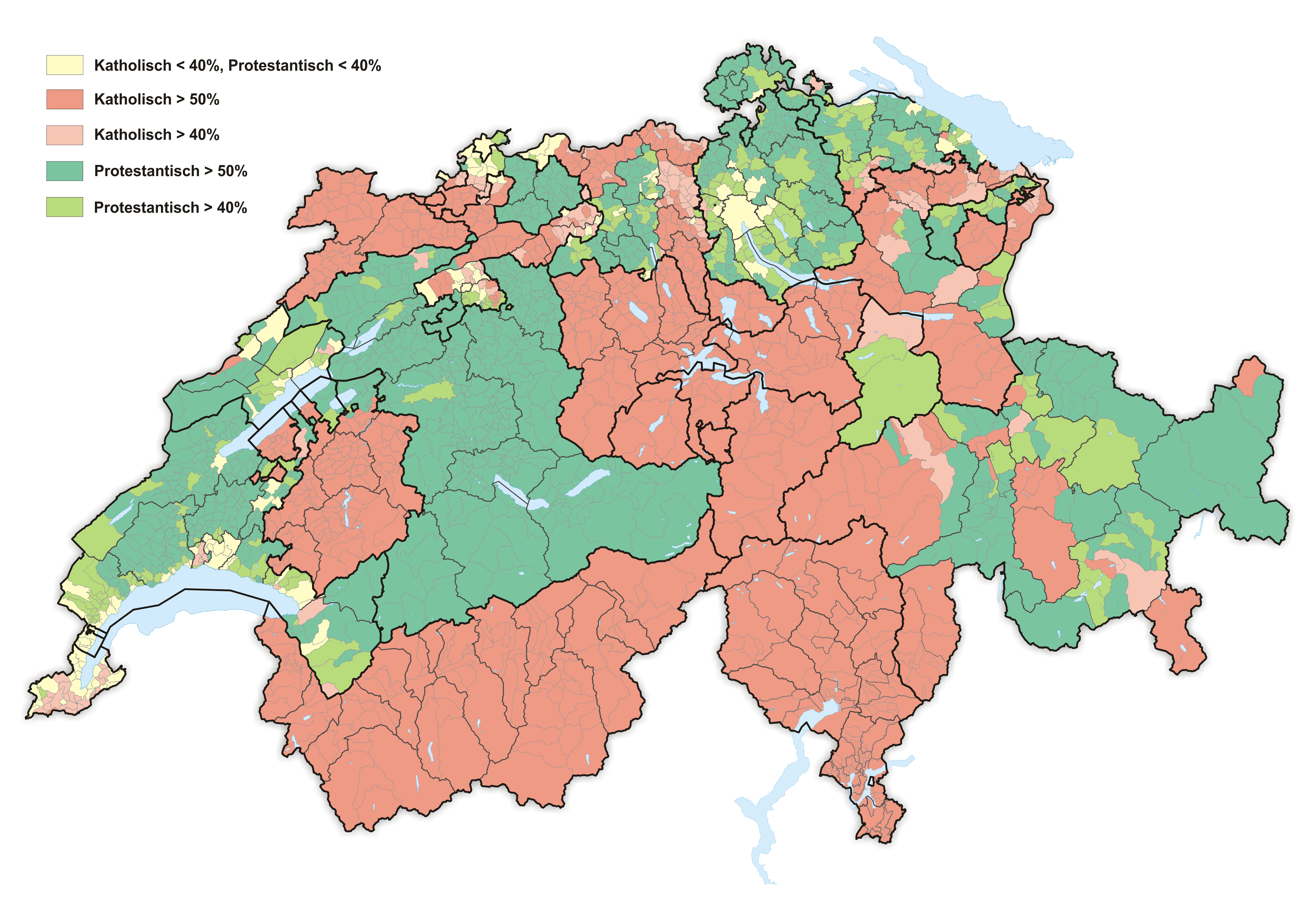
Religions in Switzerland by municipality in 2017.

Religion in Switzerland by canton, 2018 (absolute majorities with coloured background)
Arms	Canton	Population (numbers)			Percentages			
Arms	Canton	Total	Catholic	Protestant	Catholic	Protestant	Protestant + Catholic	Unaffiliated + other*
Coat of arms of Zürich	Zürich	1,520,968	387,325	425,145	25.5	28.0	53.4	46.6
Coat of arms of Bern	Bern	1,034,977	164,866	541,148	15.9	52.3	68.2	31.8
Coat of arms of Vaud	Vaud	799,145	250,543	205,775	31.4	25.7	57.1	42.9
Coat of arms of Aargau	Aargau	678,207	215,984	161,317	31.8	23.8	55.6	44.4
Coat of arms of St. Gallen	St. Gallen	507,697	226,264	104,851	44.6	20.7	65.2	34.8
Coat of arms of Geneva	Genève	499,480	219,477	62,769	43.9	12.6	56.5	43.5
Coat of arms of Luzern	Luzern	409,557	245,397	41,673	59.9	10.2	70.1	29.9
Coat of arms of Ticino	Ticino	353,343	235,570	5,356	66.7	1.5	68.2	31.8
Coat of arms of Valais	Valais	343,955	261,963	20,042	76.2	5.8	82.0	18.0
Coat of arms of Fribourg	Fribourg	318,714	197,559	41,534	62.0	13.0	75.0	25.0
Coat of arms of Basel-Country	Basel-Landschaft	288,132	71,541	85,388	24.8	29.6	54.5	45.5
Coat of arms of Thurgau	Thurgau	276,472	85,104	93,628	30.8	33.9	64.6	35.4
Coat of arms of Solothurn	Solothurn	274,748	86,518	58,522	31.5	21.3	52.8	47.2
Coat of arms of Graubünden	Graubünden	198,379	89,768	66,536	45.3	33.5	78.8	21.2
Coat of arms of Basel-City	Basel-Stadt	194,766	24,783	26,380	12.7	13.5	26.3	73.7
Coat of arms of Neuchâtel	Neuchâtel	176,850	64,258	51,378	36.3	29.1	65.4	34.6
Coat of arms of Schwyz	Schwyz	159,165	95,794	18,390	60.2	11.6	71.7	28.3
Coat of arms of Zug	Zug	126,837	61,999	17,070	48.9	13.5	62.3	37.7
Coat of arms of Schaffhausen	Schaffhausen	81,991	17,155	29,190	20.9	35.6	56.5	43.5
Coat of arms of Jura	Jura	73,419	55,000	7,023	74.9	9.6	84.5	15.5
Coat of arms of Appenzell Ausserrhoden Coat of arms of Appenzell Innerrhoden	Appenzell Ausserrhoden & Innerrhoden (Note: Because of overlapping church areas, there are no separate data about church members in the cantons of Appenzell Ausserrhoden and Appenzell Innerrhoden. Historically, the percentage of Protestants is high in Ausserrhoden, while Catholics form a majority in Innerrhoden.)	71,379	27,942	23,513	39.1	32.9	72.1	27.9
Coat of arms of Nidwalden	Nidwalden	43,223	28,363	4,336	65.6	10.0	75.6	24.3
Coat of arms of Glarus	Glarus	40,403	13,383	13,768	33.1	34.1	67.2	32.8
Coat of arms of Obwalden	Obwalden	37,841	26,944	2,937	71.2	7.8	79.0	21.0
Coat of arms of Uri	Uri	36,433	28,582	1,691	78.5	4.6	83.1	16.9
Coat of arms of Switzerland	Switzerland	8,546,081	3,182,082	2,109,360	37.2	24.7	61.9	38.1

* Includes other Christians, Muslims and other religions.

=== Religion by ethnic origin, sex, age, and education ===
According to the Swiss Federal Statistical Office, based on cumulative data collected between 2013 and 2017, there were significant differences in the religious affiliations of the five most common ethno-national groups in Switzerland: Swiss nationals were mostly Christians (73%), evenly divided between Catholics (37%), Swiss Protestants (31%) and other Christians (5%); the vast majority of Italian and Portuguese nationals living in Switzerland were Catholics (77% and 74%, respectively); half of German nationals in Switzerland were unaffiliated, while Christians were minority accounting for 47%; and Frenchmen in Switzerland were mostly unaffiliated (55%), while only 38% of them were Christians. Among other major groups, individuals from the Balkans were predominantly Muslim (61%), while 26% identified as Christians. Turks also showed a strong Muslim majority (73%), whereas those from North Africa and the Middle East were overwhelmingly Muslim (80% and 61%, respectively). By contrast, Sub-Saharan Africans were mostly Christian (67%), as were people from Other EU countries (54%), Asia (16%), and the Americas and Caribbean (54%). Residents of Asian origin displayed greater diversity: 16% Christians, 23% unaffiliated, and about 13% Muslims. Those of American and Caribbean origin were primarily Christian (54%) but also had a notable share of unaffiliated individuals (41%).

Major ethno-national groups in Switzerland by religion, 2013–2017 (majority in light green)
Religion	Swiss	Italians	Germans	Balkans*	Portuguese	French	Spaniards	Turks	Other EU	North African**	Subsaharan African	Middle eastern***	Asian	American & Caribbean	Oceanian	Other (unspecified)
Christianity	72.9	80.9	47.0	26.0	76.7	38.5	65.8	2.1	54.2	2.9	66.8	9.4	15.5	53.8	25	11.8
–Catholicism	36.7	76.9	22.6	5.0	73.9	33.5	62.8	0.3	32.8	0.5	21.1	4.2	9.7	38.8	9.9	2.7
–Swiss Protestantism	31.2	0.6	20.3	0.1	0.4	2.3	0.6	0.2	5.5	0.2	10.2	0.8	1.9	5.8	4.7	3.5
–Other Christians	5.0	3.4	4.1	20.9	2.4	2.7	2.4	1.6	15.9	2.2	35.5	4.4	3.9	9.2	10.4	5.6
Islam	2.4	1.2	1.4	61.1	0.3	2.7	0.6	72.9	1.8	79.8	18.9	61.4	12.9	0.7	1	72.9
Judaism	0.2	0.1	0.2	0.2	0.3	0.9	0.1	0.1	0.5	0.4	0.8	3	0.1	0.9	0.9	0
Other religion	0.9	0.4	0.2	0.5	0.4	1.1	0.4	1.2	0.7	0.8	1.6	2	47.2	1.5	1.6	4.7
No religion	22.4	16.1	50.0	10.8	20.3	54.6	31.1	22.3	41.7	15.9	9.7	22.3	22.9	41.4	70.6	10.1
Not stated	1.2	1.4	0.7	1.5	2.4	2.4	1.8	1.4	1.1	2	2.2	1.9	1.4	1.7	0.7	0
*Includes people with origins from Albania, Serbia, Bosnia and Herzegovina, Montenegro, North Macedonia, Kosovo. ** Includes people with origins from Algeria, Morocco, Tunisia, Libya and Egypt. *** Includes people with origins from Irak, Iran, Israel, Yemen, Jordan, Qatar, Kuwait, Lebanon, Oman UAE, Saudi Arabia, Syria and Palestine.

According to the Swiss Federal Statistical Office, based on cumulative data collected between 2019 and 2023, notable shifts can be observed in the religious composition of major ethno-national groups in Switzerland. Swiss nationals remained predominantly Christian (65%), divided between Catholics (33%), Swiss Protestants (27%), and other Christians (5%), though the share of unaffiliated individuals increased to around 31%. Italians and Portuguese continued to be largely Catholic (67% and 66%, respectively), while Germans were mainly unaffiliated (57%) and less than half identified as Christians (40%). French residents were also predominantly unaffiliated (63%), with less than one-third identifying as Christians (29%). Among other major groups, individuals from the Balkans were overwhelmingly Muslim (58%), with about one-quarter Christians. Turks also showed a strong Muslim majority (64%), as did North Africans (73%) and Middle Easterners (61%). Sub-Saharan Africans, by contrast, remained mostly Christian (67%), while people from Other EU countries were more evenly split between Christians (47%) and unaffiliated (49%). Asians showed a more balanced distribution, with 13% Christians, 37% unaffiliated, and 14% Muslims. People from the Americas and Caribbean were primarily Christian (45%), though a substantial proportion (51%) declared no religion.

Major ethno-national groups in Switzerland by religion, 2019–2023 (majority in light green)
Religion	Swiss	Italians	Germans	Balkans*	Portuguese	French	Spaniards	Turks	Other EU	North African**	Subsaharan African	Middle eastern***	Asian	American & Caribbean	Oceanian	Other (Unspecified)
Christianity	64.6	70	40.1	24.5	68	29.4	52.3	2	46.7	2.2	66.8	8.7	13.3	45.4	22.9	11.6
–Catholicism	33	66.5	18.9	4.9	65.8	25.7	49.1	0.3	26.4	0.3	17.4	3.6	8.4	30.8	10.7	2.9
–Swiss Protestantism	27	0.5	16.8	0.1	0.4	1.6	1	0.2	3.6	0.2	8.5	1.1	1.5	5.5	3.9	0.00
–Other Christians	4.6	3	3.8	19.5	1.8	2.1	2.2	1.5	16.7	1.7	40.9	4	3.4	9.1	8.3	8.7
Islam	2.6	3.5	2.1	58.4	0.5	4	1.4	64.1	2.4	73.4	18.1	61.1	18	0.8	1.4	70
Judaism	0.2	0.1	0.2	0.1	0.00	0.8	0.1	0.1	0.4	0.00	0.8	1.7	0.00	0.7	0.00	0
Other religion	0.9	0.4	0.6	0.1	0.2	0.7	0.2	0.6	0.6	0.3	0.6	1.4	37.2	1.2	2.7	4.1
No religion	30.8	25	57	15.7	29.9	63.7	45	32	49.1	22.1	12.1	25.5	30.2	50.9	73	14.3
Not stated	0.9	1	0.6	1.2	1.4	1.4	1	1.2	0.8	2	1.6	1.6	1.3	1	0.00	0
*Includes people with origins from Albania, Serbia, Bosnia and Herzegovina, Montenegro, North Macedonia, Kosovo. ** Includes people with origins from Algeria, Morocco, Tunisia, Lybia and Egypt. *** Includes people with origins from Irak, Iran, Israel, Yemen, Jordan, Qatar, Kuwait, Lebanon, Oman UAE, Saudi Arabia, Syria and Palestine.

Religion in Switzerland by origin, sex, age and education, 2018 (majority in coloured background)
Sociodemographic characteristics		Christianity	Catholic	Swiss Protestant	Other Christian	Islam	Other religion	No religion	Not stated
Population (age 15+)
Population (age 15+)	Female	66	36	24	6	5	2	26	1
Population (age 15+)	Male	62	35	22	5	6	1	30	1
Population (age 15+)	Age 15-24 (youth)	62	34	21	7	8	2	27	1
Population (age 15+)	Age 25-64 (middle-aged)	60	34	20	6	6	2	31	1
Population (age 15+)	Age 65+ (elderly)	79	40	35	4	1	1	17	2
Population (age 15+)	Compulsory education	64	41	17	6	12	3	20	1
Population (age 15+)	High school degree	69	36	27	6	4	1	26	1
Population (age 15+)	University degree	58	31	22	5	3	2	36	1
Swiss nationals (age 15+)
Swiss nationals (age 15+)	Female	71	36	30	5	2	1	24	2
Swiss nationals (age 15+)	Male	67	34	28	5	3	1	28	1
Swiss nationals (age 15+)	Age 15-24 (youth)	66	35	25	6	5	1	27	1
Swiss nationals (age 15+)	Age 25-64 (middle-aged)	65	34	26	5	3	1	29	2
Swiss nationals (age 15+)	Age 65+ (elderly)	81	38	38	5	0	1	17	1
Swiss nationals (age 15+)	Compulsory education	71	40	26	5	5	2	20	2
Swiss nationals (age 15+)	High school degree	71	35	31	5	2	1	25	1
Swiss nationals (age 15+)	University degree	64	32	28	4	2	1	32	1
Foreign nationals (age 15+)
Foreign nationals (age 15+)	Female	50	35	5	10	14	3	31	2
Foreign nationals (age 15+)	Male	47	35	4	8	14	3	35	1
Foreign nationals (age 15+)	Age 15-24 (youth)	48	34	3	11	21	3	27	1
Foreign nationals (age 15+)	Age 25-64 (middle-aged)	46	33	4	9	13	3	36	2
Foreign nationals (age 15+)	Age 65+ (elderly)	69	54	7	8	9	2	18	2
Foreign nationals (age 15+)	Compulsory education	53	42	2	9	22	4	20	1
Foreign nationals (age 15+)	High school degree	51	37	5	9	14	2	32	1
Foreign nationals (age 15+)	University degree	42	27	7	8	5	3	49	1

== Practice and attendance ==
The proportion of Swiss people believing in a single god fell from 46% to 38% between 2014 and 2024, according to the Federal Statistical Office. This decline is particularly marked among those aged 65 and over, with a decrease of 14 percentage points in ten years. Religion remains important for 56% of Swiss people in difficult times and for 52% in case of illness. More than a quarter of those who have left their religion cite loss of faith or disagreement with their religious community. By 2024, half of the Swiss population never attended a religious event in the 12 months preceding the survey.

According to Pew 2018, 11% 'Believe in God, absolutely certain', 38% 'Believe in God, fairly certain', 13% 'Believe in God, less certain' and 33% 'Do not believe in God'.

The requirement for priests and monks to serve in the army since June 2026, has offended Swiss churches who are denouncing the fact that the Federal Council did not consult them before revising the law, as is customary for any legislative change in Switzerland. According to the government, pastoral ministry is reportedly no longer even considered "an activity essential to the maintenance of social life".

== Religions ==
=== Christianity ===
The Swiss flag is formed by the Greek Cross, symbol of Christianity.

According to the national structural survey of 2020, Christianity was the religion of 61.2% of the population, of whom 33.8% were Catholics, 21.8% were Swiss Protestants - almost all adherents of Calvinism -, and 5.6% were adherents of other Christian denominations - including Orthodox Christians, Lutherans, nondenominational Evangelicals, Jehovah's Witnesses, and other Christian movements. Christianity has declined significantly since the 1970s, at first in the urban centres and later also in the rural countrysides.

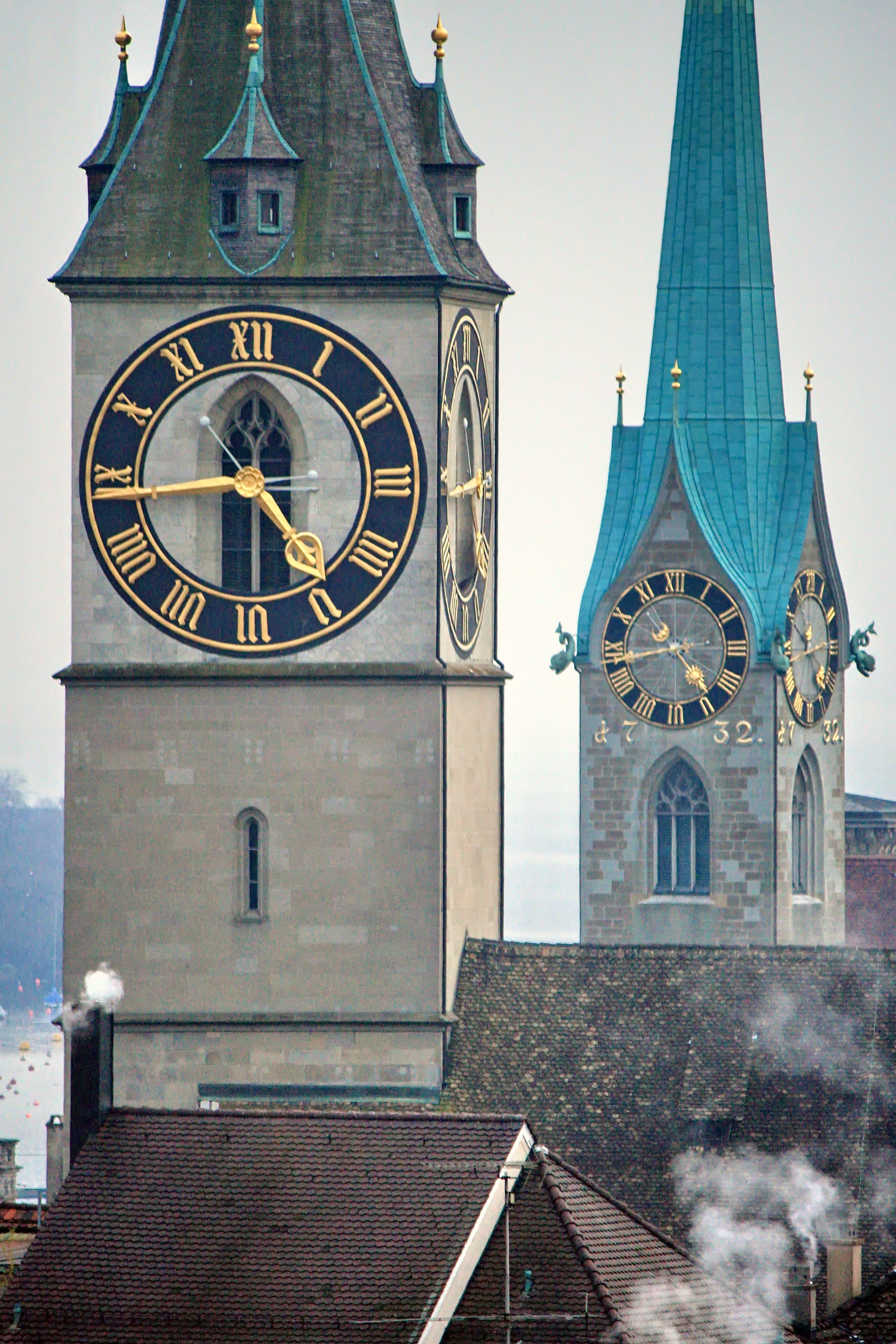
Typical large clocks characterising the towers of Swiss Protestant churches; here the towers of St. Peter and Fraumünster in Zürich.

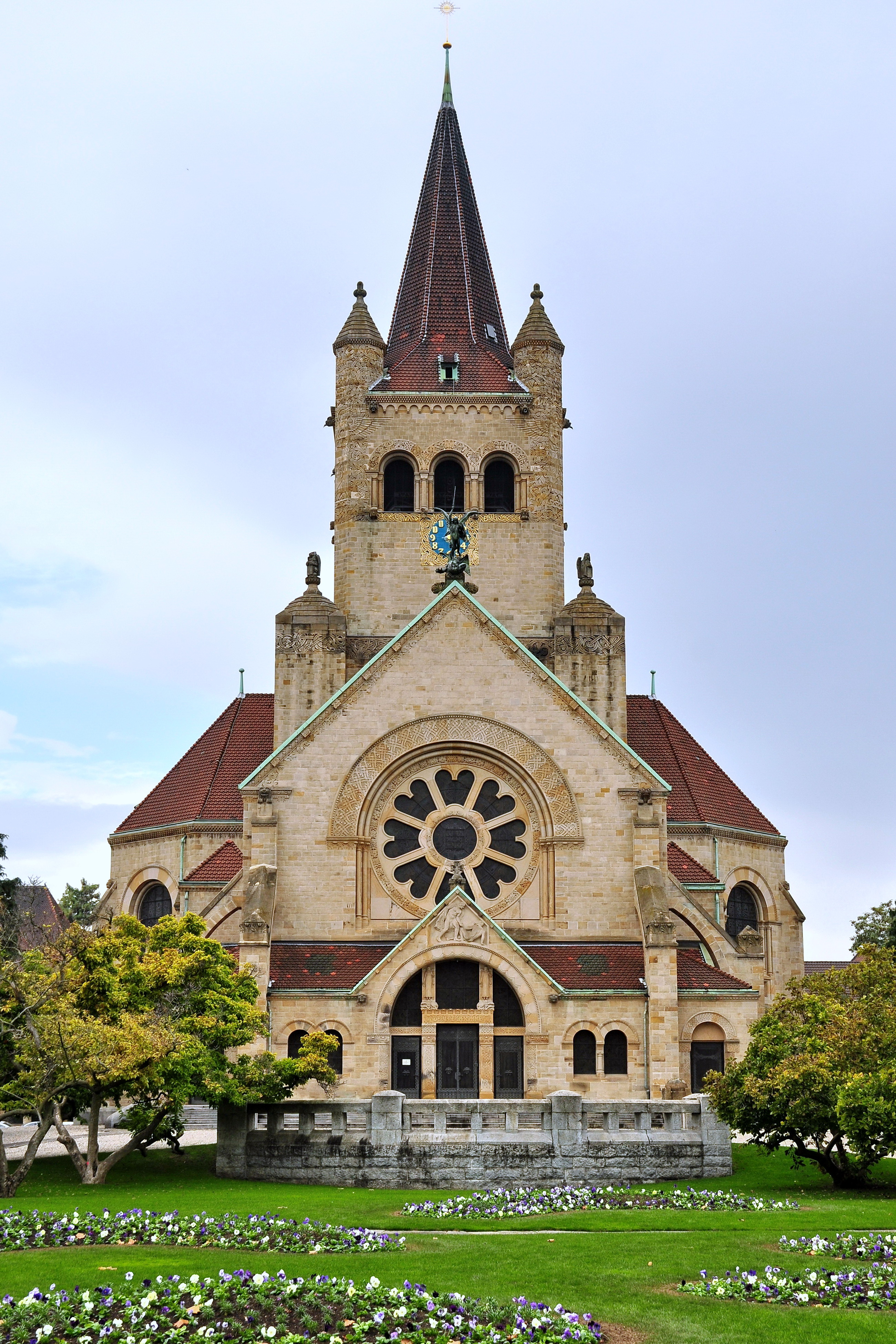
Calvinist Church of Saint Paul, in Basel.

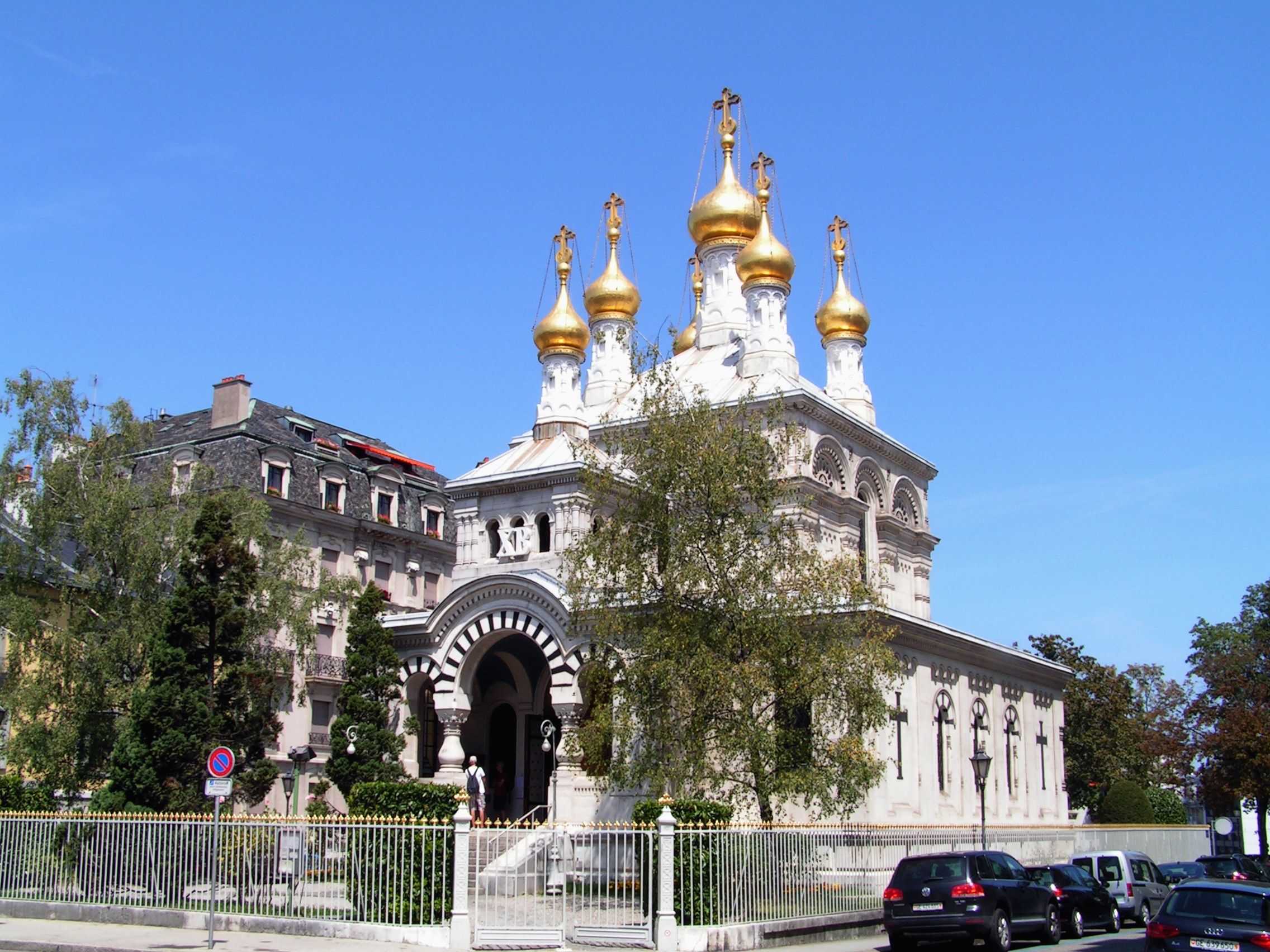
Russian Orthodox church in Geneva.

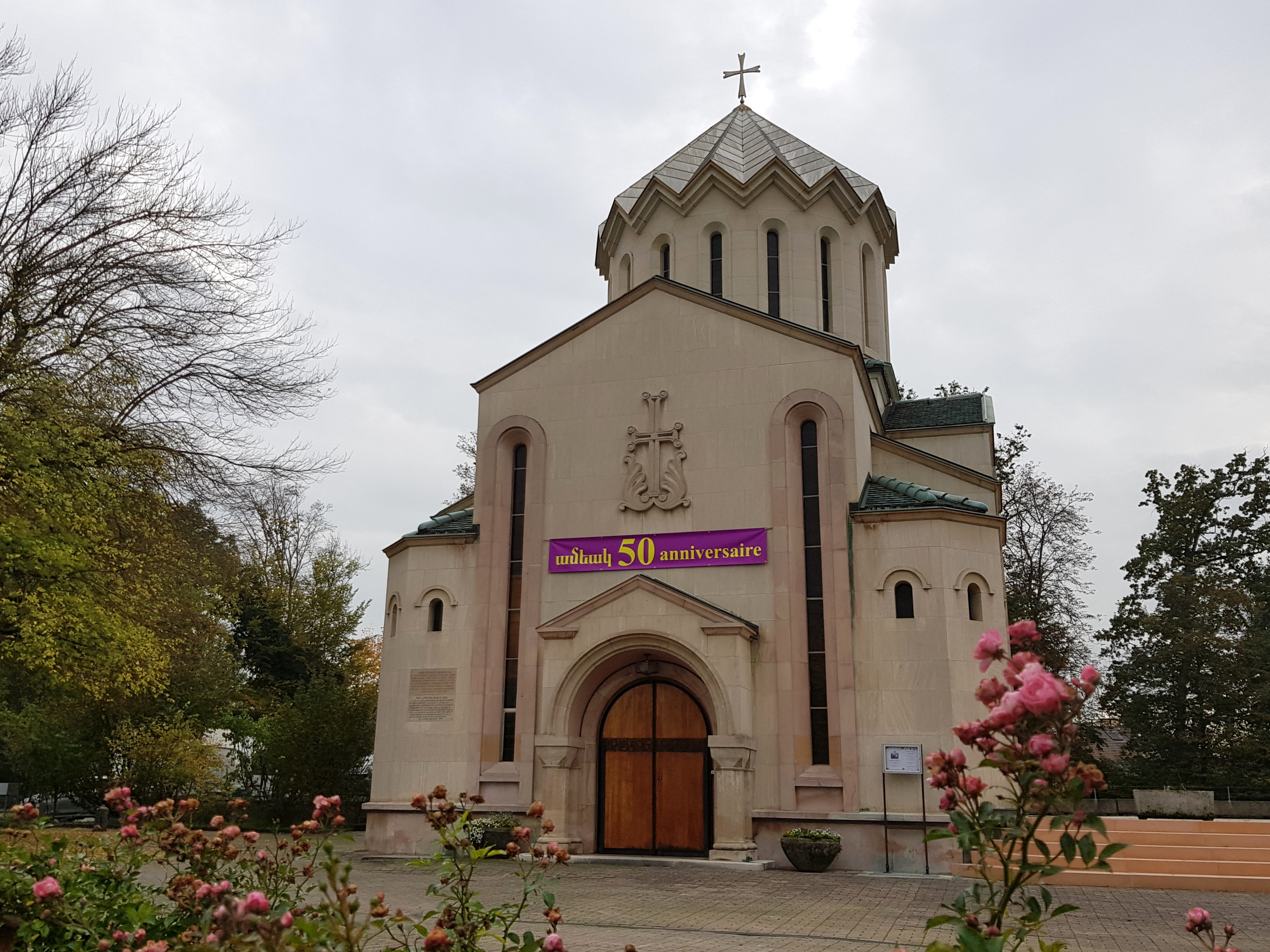
Armenian Apostolic Church of Saint Hagop in Geneva.

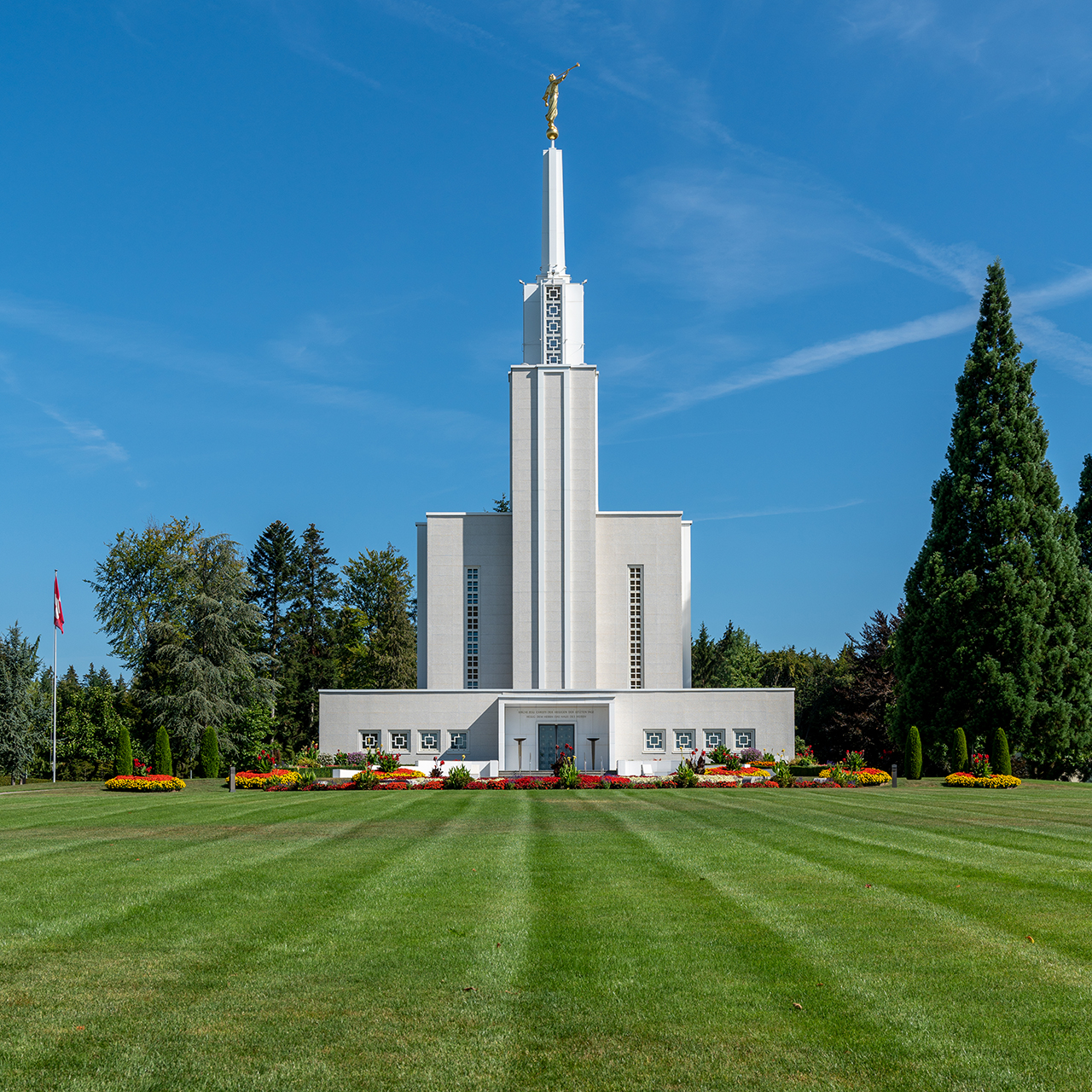
Bern Switzerland Temple of the Church of Jesus Christ of Latter-day Saints.

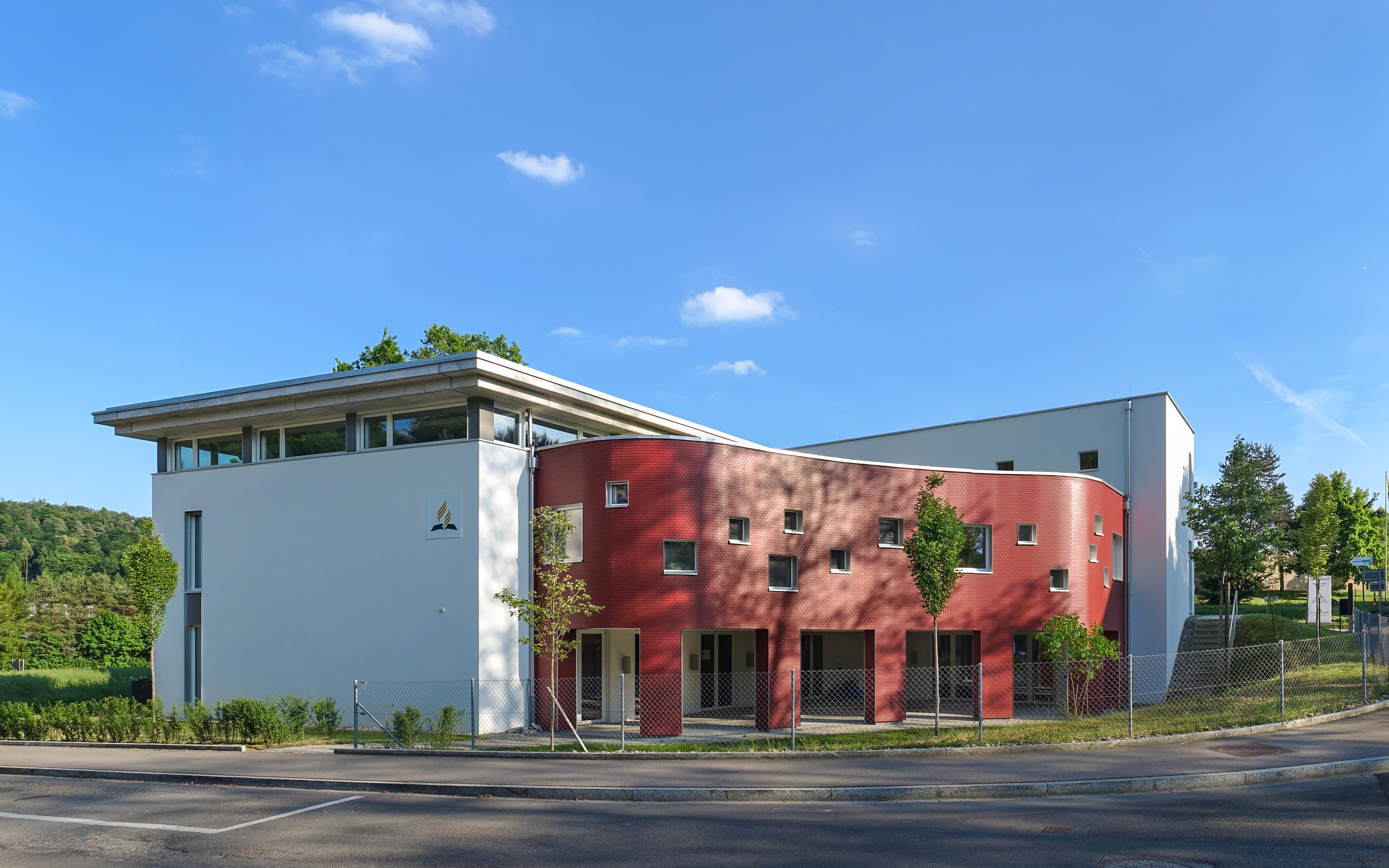
Seventh-day Adventist church in Schaffhausen.

=== Other religions ===
Islam is the second largest religion in Switzerland after Christianity, adhered to by 5.4% of the population in 2020. Swiss Muslims are mostly of foreign origin (mostly of Arab ancestry those in the Gallo-Romance regions, and mostly of Balkan, Turkish and Iranian ancestry those in the Germanic regions), although there is an increasing number of native Swiss converts. Religious Jews represented 0.2% of the Swiss population in 2020. Other religions present in the country include Hinduism and Buddhism, practised by both local Swiss who have nurtured interest in Eastern doctrines and by immigrants from Asia. There is a Taoist temple, Ming Shan (明山, "Mountain of Light"), located in Bullet, Vaud, and built according to the rules of feng shui; it is the headquarters of the Swiss Taoist Association and the main centre in Europe of the Taoist tradition of Wujimen (无极门, "Gate of Infinity"), (Note: The Wujimen tradition is focused on the worship of the stars, especially Ursa Major, used to find the pole star at the north celestial pole and then the immutable principle at the heart of all beings.) which originated on the Min Mountains of Sichuan, China. In the country there are also various new religious movements, among which one of the most influential has been the Theosophy-derived Anthroposophy; the Anthroposophical Society was established by the Austrian occultist Rudolf Steiner in the 1920s and 1930s in Dornach, Solothurn, and it is known for its promotion of the well-reputed Waldorf schools.

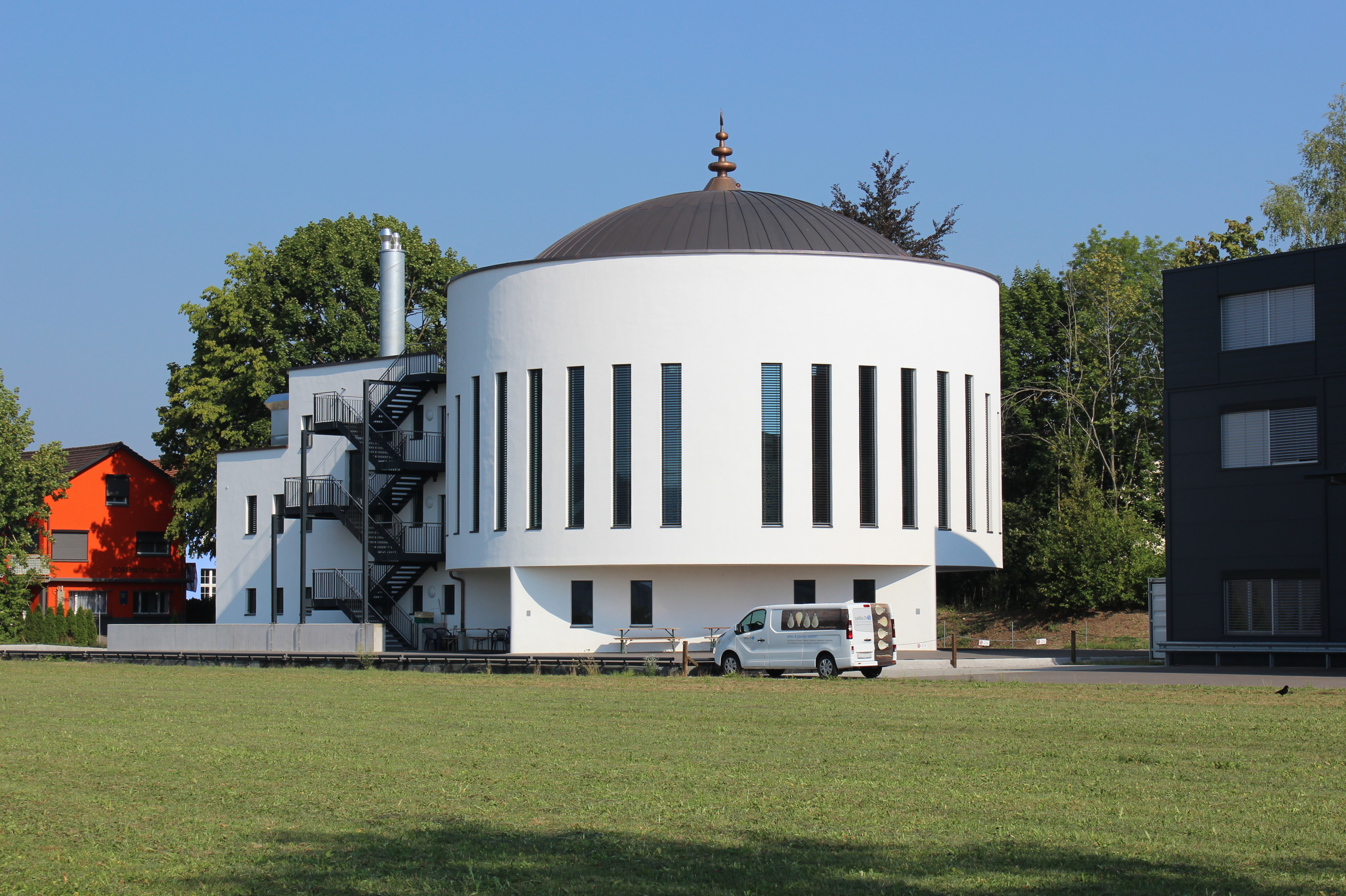
Mosque of Wil, canton of St. Gallen.

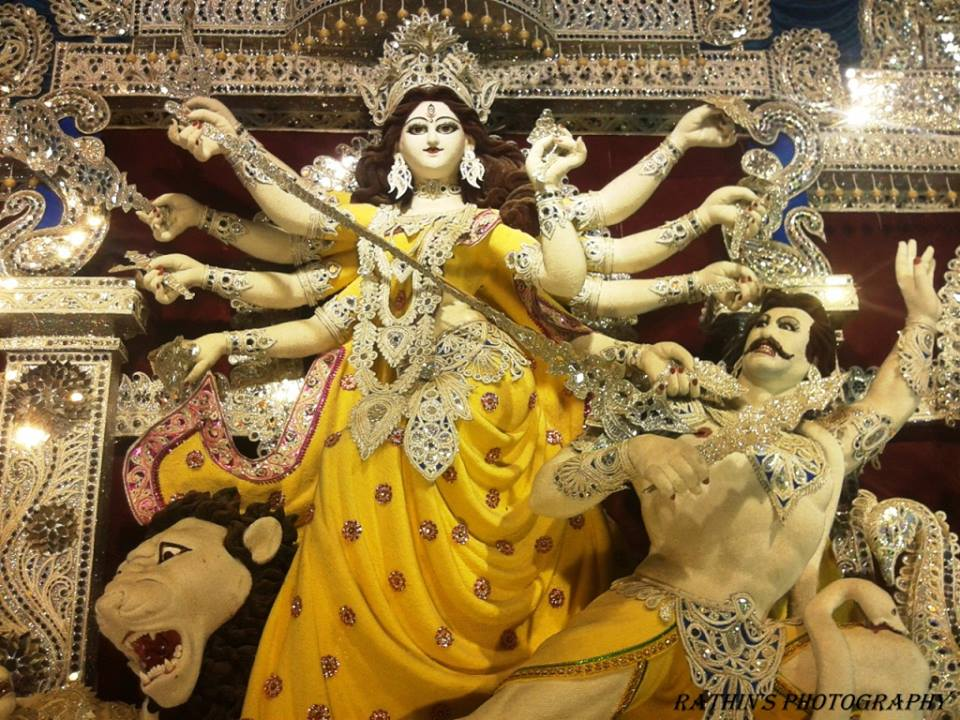
Statue of the goddess Durga at the Hindu temple of Trimbach, canton of Solothurn.

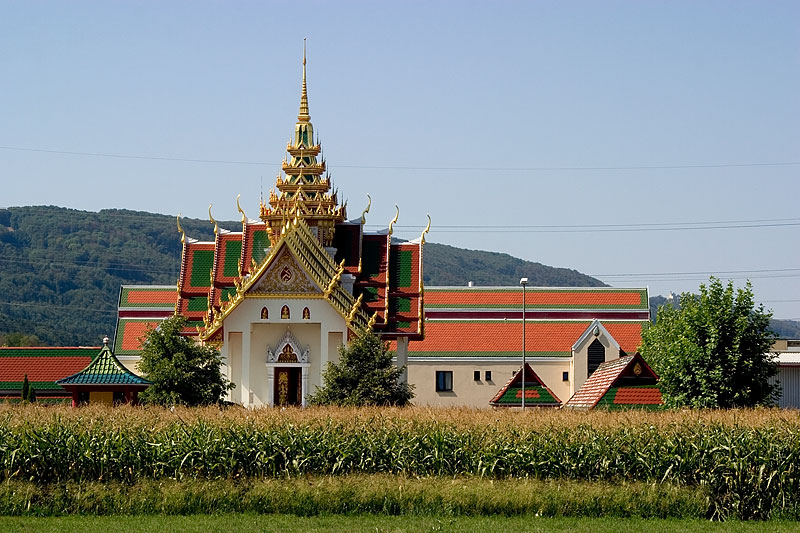
A Thai Theravada Buddhist temple in Gretzenbach, canton of Solothurn.

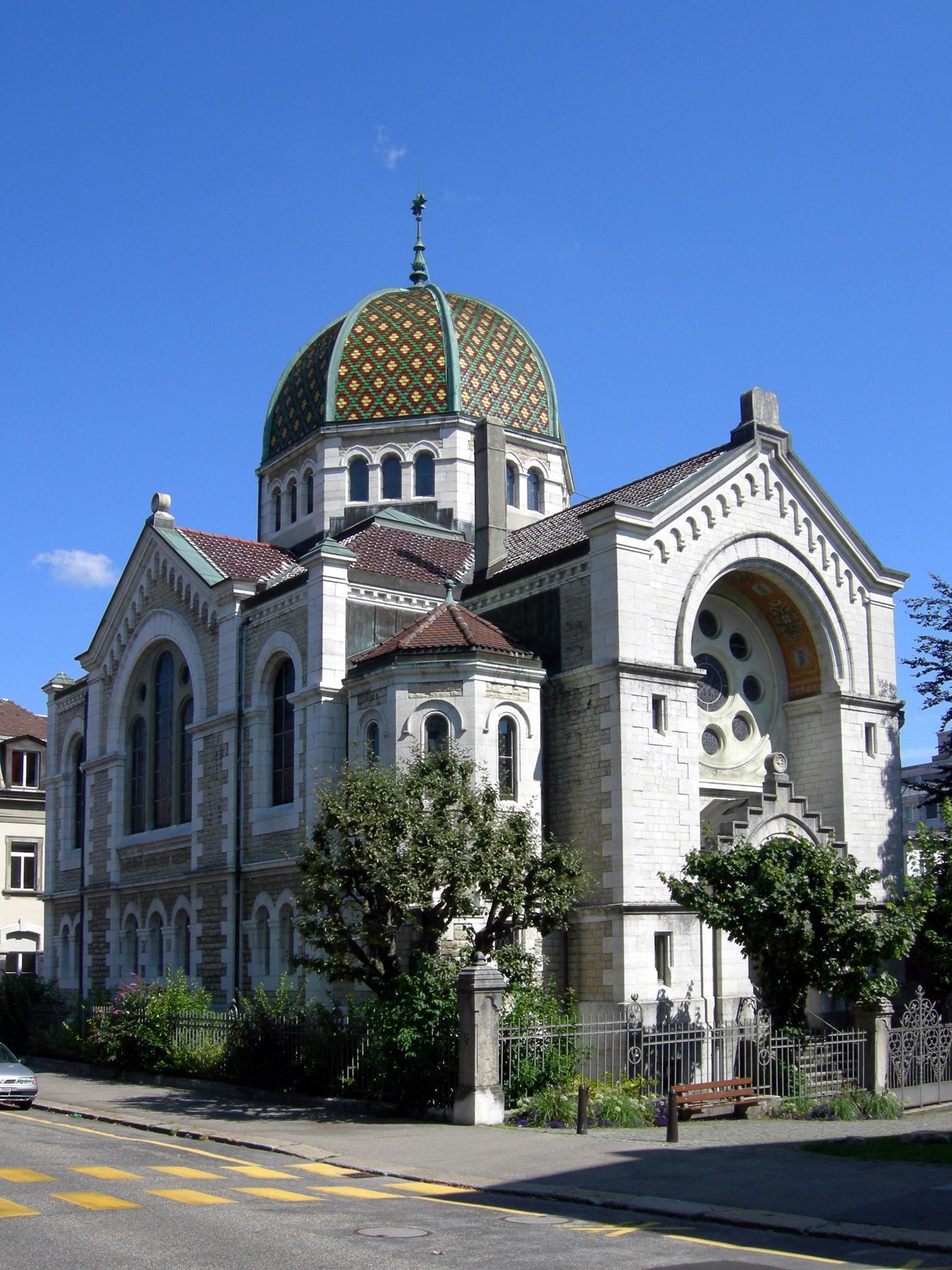
Jewish synagogue of La Chaux-de-Fonds, canton of Neuchâtel.

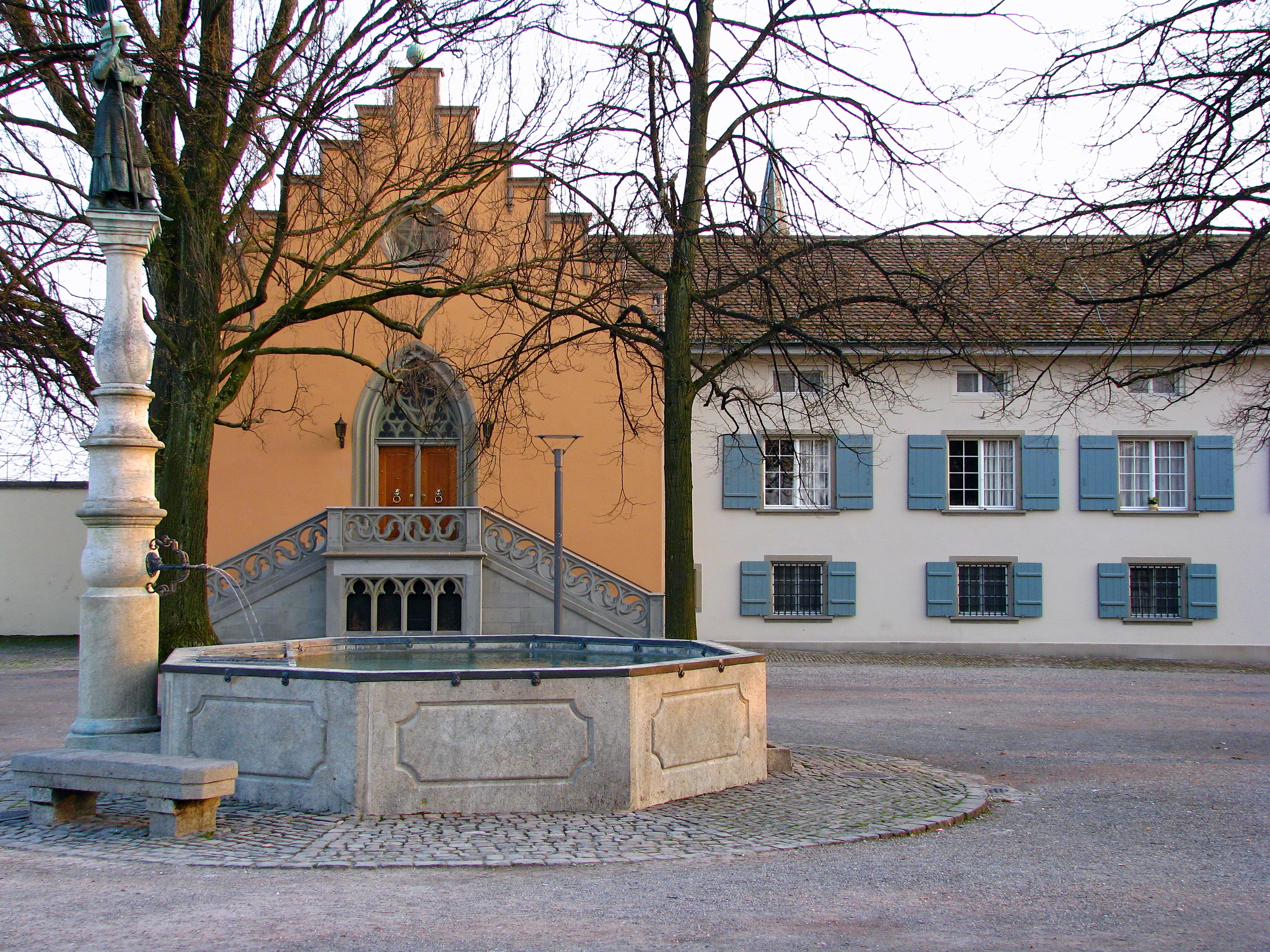
Masonic temple of Lindenhof hill, central Zürich.

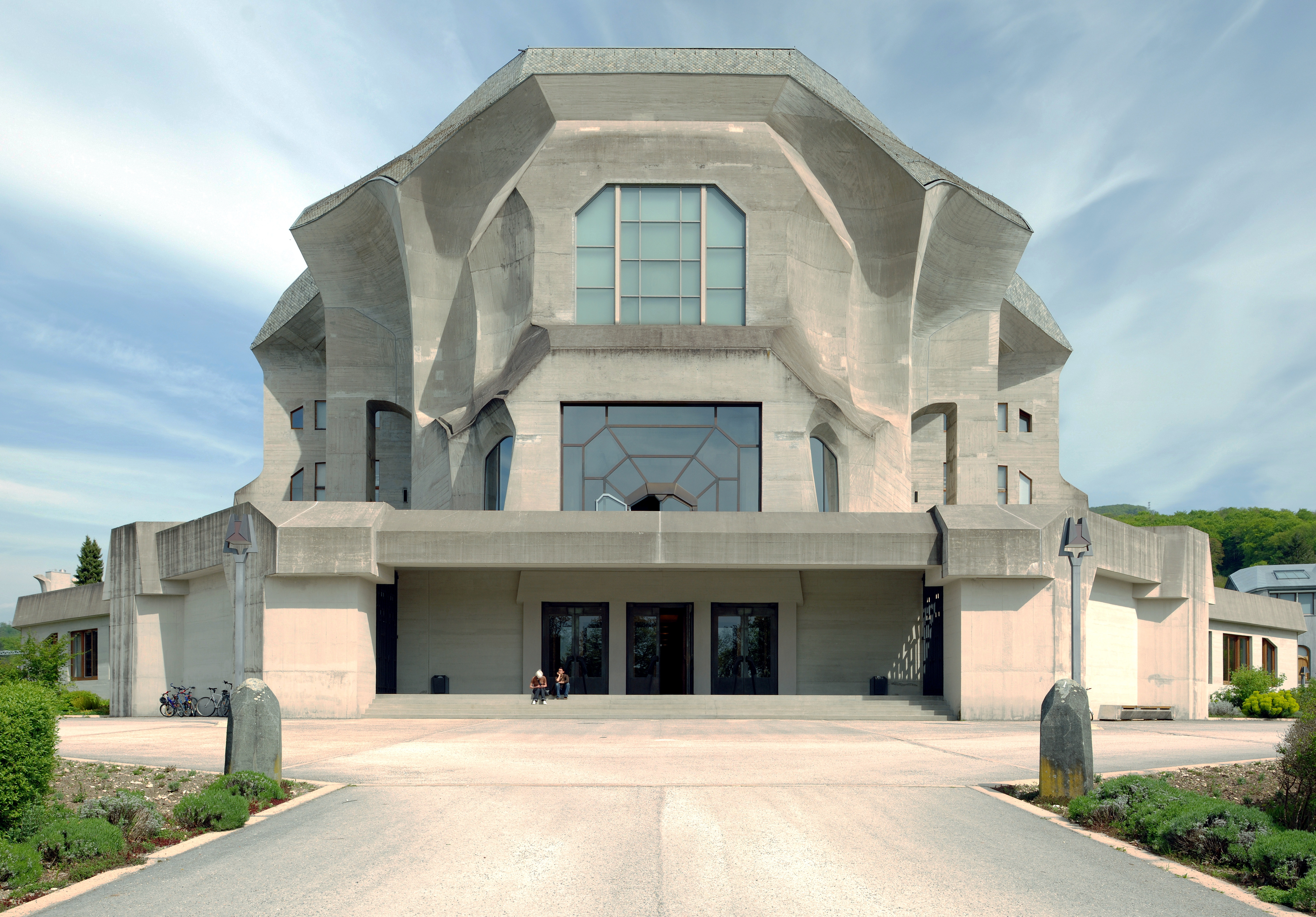
The Goetheanum, the headquarters of the Anthroposophical Society.

== History ==
=== 4th–7th centuries: Gallo-Romans and Alemanni, and their Christianisation ===
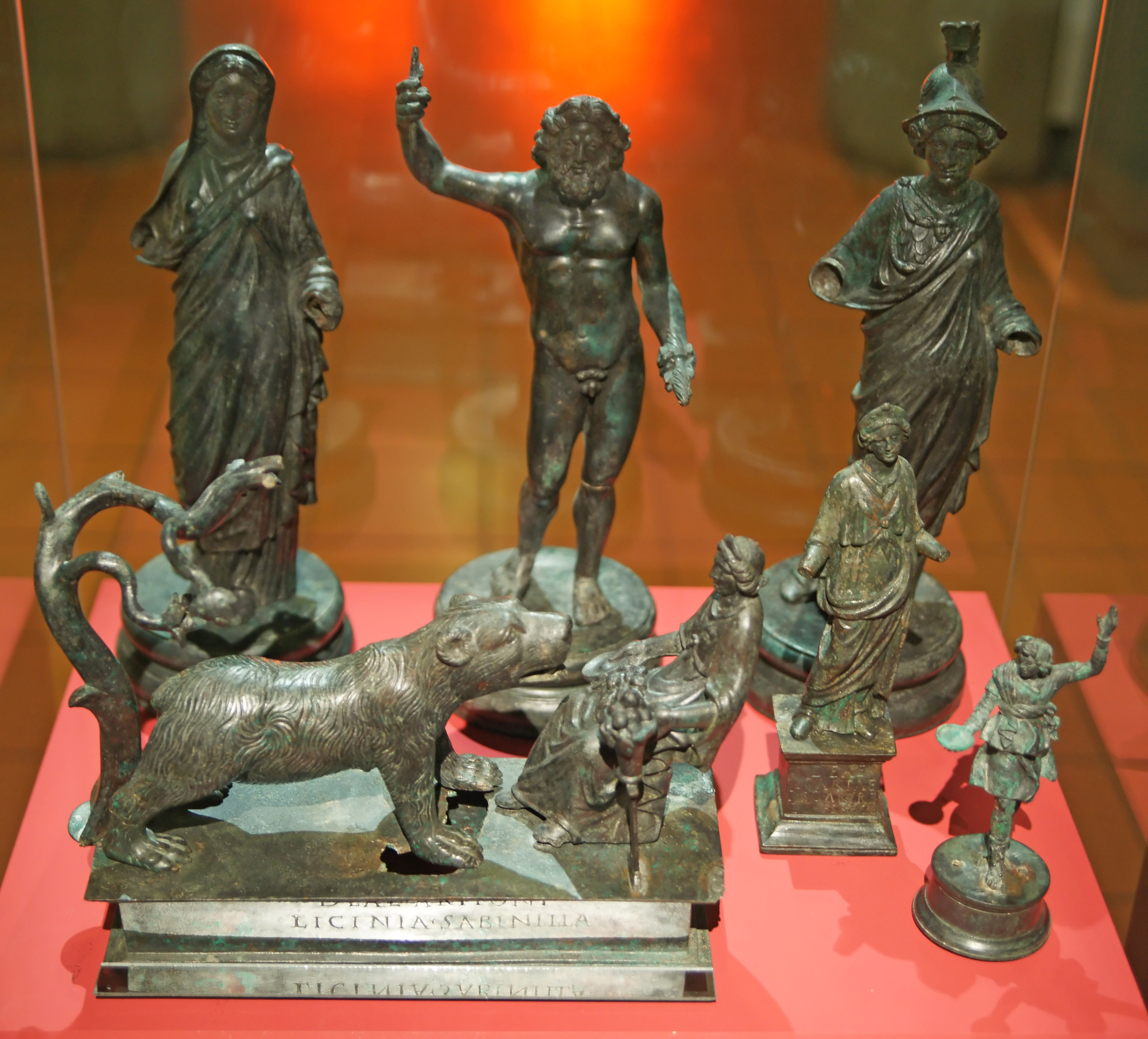
The Muri statuette group found in Muri bei Bern, representing a Gallo-Roman pantheon: Jupiter, Juno, Minerva, Naria, Artio and a lar.

The ancestors of the modern Swiss were:

- the Gaulish Helvetii and Gallicised Rhaetians, who between the 1st century BCE and the 4th century were Romanised and had become part of the Roman Empire, and
- the Germanic peoples who settled the area of modern Switzerland in the Migration Period during the 6th and the 7th centuries, after the collapse of the Roman power; these included:
  - the Alemanni, who settled the eastern regions and maintained their Alemannic German language, and
  - the Burgundians, who settled the western fringes of modern Switzerland and Burgundy and were assimilated by the Gallo-Romans.

During the 8th and 9th centuries the linguistic boundary between the Gallo-Romance-speaking western regions and the central and western Alemannic-speaking regions had already formed clearly, and during the 13th and 14th centuries the Swiss Plateau became completely Alemannic-speaking. Pockets of Rhaeto-Romance speakers persisted in isolated valleys of the south-eastern region of modern Switzerland.

A Roman inscription with the Chi Rho symbol in Sion, dated 377, is the earliest datable record of Christianity in the territory of modern Switzerland. The Gallo-Romans abandoned Gallo-Roman syncretism and adopted Christianity during the 4th and 5th centuries. The Alemanni, originally practitioners of Germanic paganism, became Christians during the 6th and 7th centuries when the area was under the Frankish Empire; the Christianisation of the Gauls was promoted at first by Roman officials and local landowners, while the later Christianisation of the Alemanii was carried out mostly by convents. Theologically monotheistic, early Christianity integrated popular polytheism by turning it into the cult of Christian saints.

=== 13th–17th centuries: Catholicism and the Calvinist Reformation in old Switzerland ===
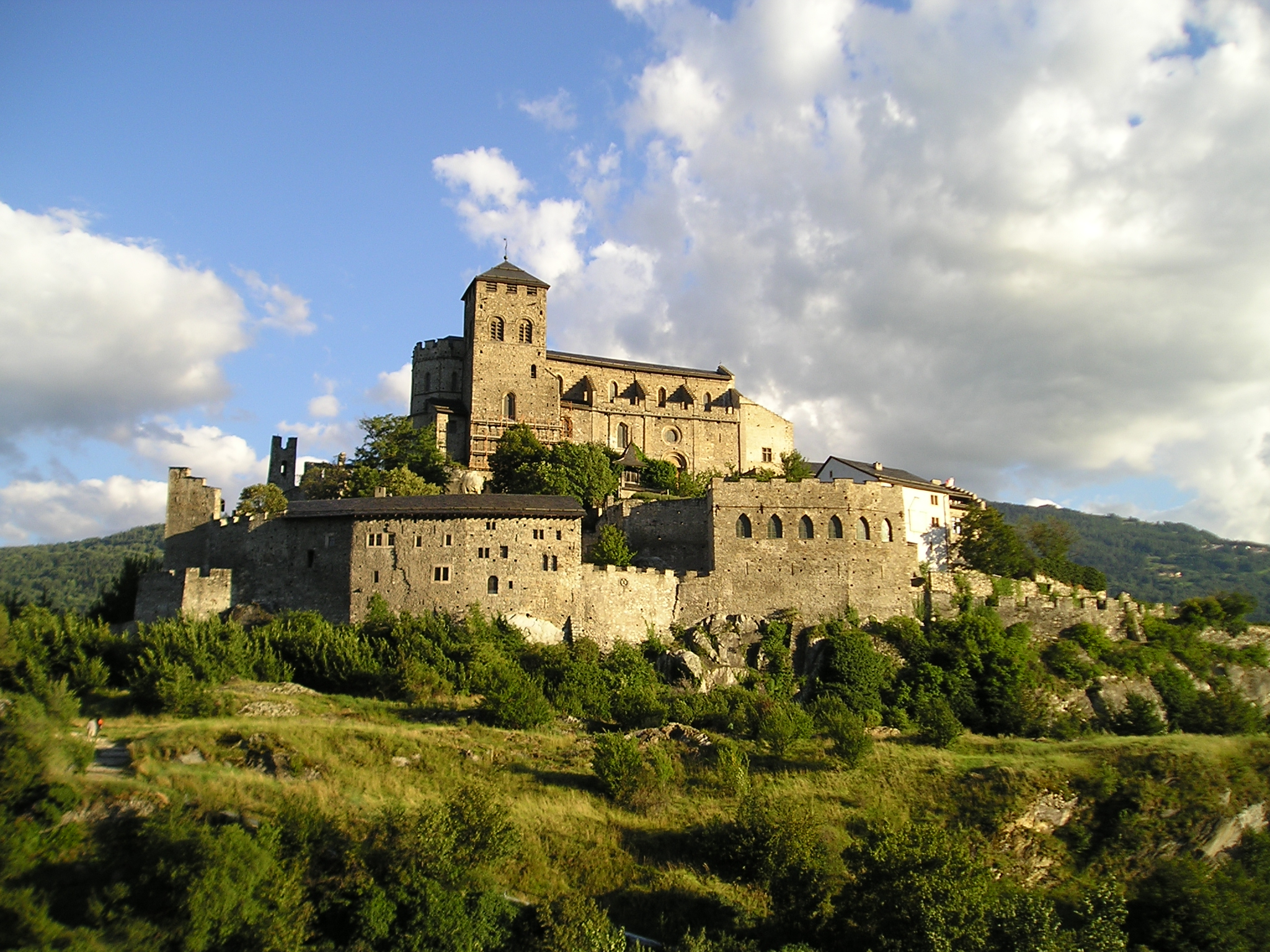
The 12th-century fortified Catholic Valère Basilica in Sion.

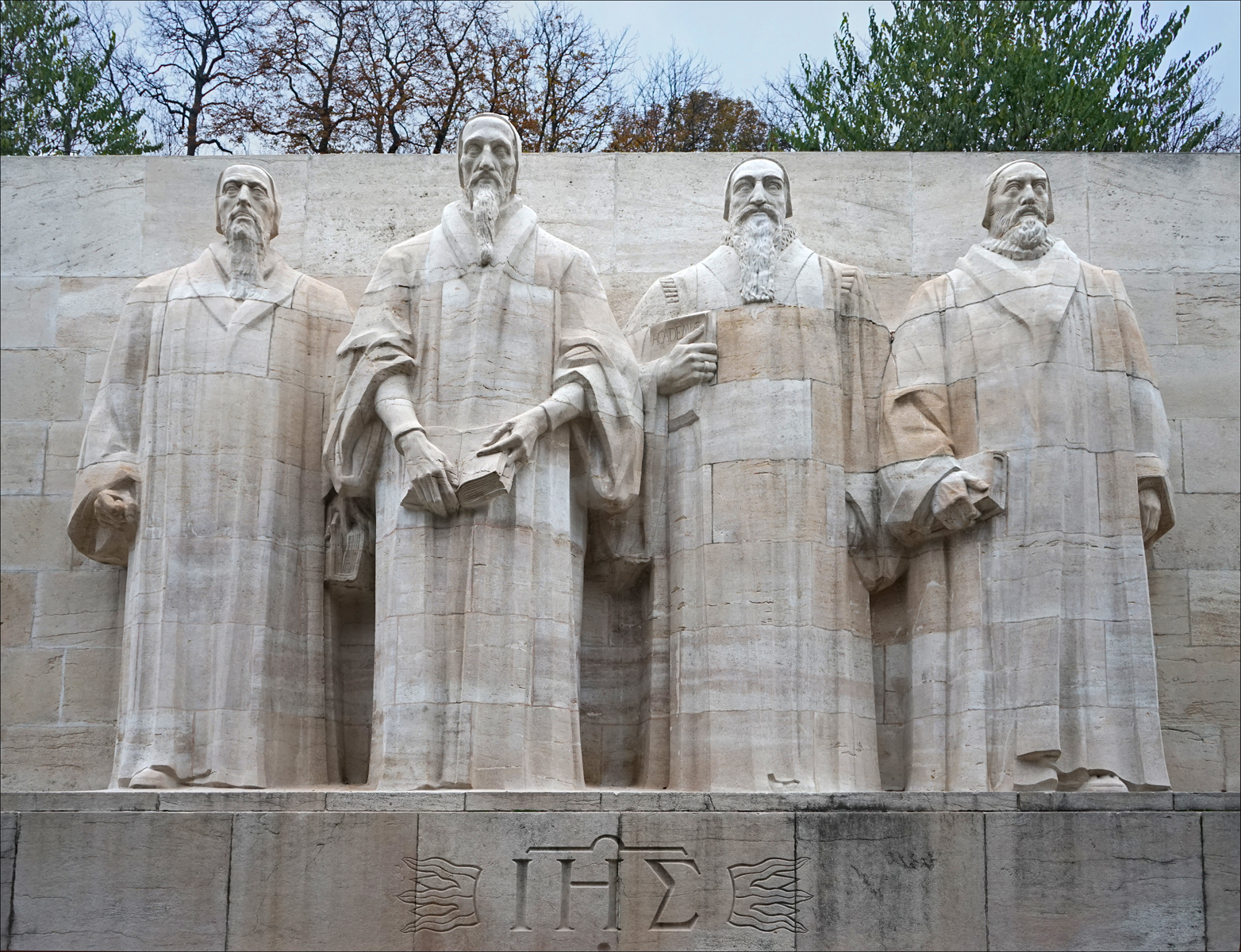
Central group of the Reformation Wall in Geneva, commemorating the founding fathers of Calvinism: William Farel, John Calvin, Theodore Beza, and John Knox.

At the beginning of the 13th century, the Old Swiss Confederacy began to emerge within the Holy Roman Empire from a pact between the cantons of Uri, Schwyz and Unterwalden to resist the power of the House of Habsburg; the pact was soon joined by other territories and by the cities of Zürich, Bern and Basel, who wanted to remain independent from the Habsburgs and from the Dukes of Burgundy. During the following centuries, the confederacy expanded to the entire territory of modern Switzerland as a network of alliances and tributary relations. The Swiss confederacy remained entirely Catholic until the 16th century, although with tiny communities of Jews attested in Swiss cities since the 12th century.

In the 16th century, Switzerland was swept by the ideas of the Protestant Reformation, and it became the world centre of the Protestant movement of Calvinism, to which a majority of the Swiss converted. Anabaptism and the Radical Reformation, and in the following century Pietism, also made inroads in Switzerland. The development of Protestantism was closely linked to the growth in power of the cities and their guilds of artisans and merchants. Elements of Christianity linked to agrarian life, the cult of saints and images, and monasticism, were all abolished, and religious life became centred no longer on ritual but on moral teaching drawn from the interpretation of the Bible. The Alemannic cantons of Zürich, Bern, Basel and Schaffhausen were the first to officially adopt the new religion under the influence of Huldrych Zwingli, while Geneva became the centre of the movement under the sway of John Calvin, who was French in origin. Geneva came to be known as the "Calvinist Rome" or the "Protestant Rome". Other areas of Switzerland remained Catholic. During the Counter-Reformation enacted by the Catholic Church in the Council of Trent (1545–1563) to thwart the spread of Protestant movements, Geneva and other Protestant cantons became havens of refuge for Calvinists from elsewhere, and in the 17th century Switzerland welcomed French Huguenots who fled France after the Edict of Nantes (1598), through which Henry IV had granted them freedom in France, was revoked by Louis XIV with the Edict of Fontainebleau (1685).

Conflicts, and even civil wars, between Protestant and Catholic cantons and cantons' districts arose. To avoid the laceration of the system of alliances between territories, the confederacy adopted the principle of territorial exclusivity of religion (cuius regio, eius religio), thereby recognising the plurality of Christian denominations on a constitutional level, although in areas of mixed religious affiliation, including Aargau, Thurgau, the surroundings of St. Gallen, the Grisons and Geneva, armed conflicts between Catholics and Protestants continued. The complete constitutional parity of the two denominations was reached through four Landfriede (land peaces), the first in 1529 and the fourth one in 1712. Meanwhile, the Swiss confederacy was recognised as fully independent from the Holy Roman Empire as part of the Peace of Westphalia in 1648. It was within Protestantism that embryonic ideas of separation of spiritual life from secular life were first developed; in Switzerland, Protestant cantons became the drivers of the economic, political and social innovation of the country, while Catholic cantons would have remained agrarian and backward until the 19th century.

=== 18th–19th centuries: the Helvetic Republic, the Sonderbund War, and the 1848 Constitution ===
The principle of exclusivity of religion in autonomous regions remained in force until 1798; whoever did not want to be part of a territory's official religion could emigrate, but had to leave all his possessions, although a few Protestant cantons granted a merciful ius emigrandi (right of emigration). The short-lived Helvetic Republic, established as a sister republic of France between 1798 and 1803, was a secular state according to the principles of the French Revolution. After the end of the Helvetic Republic and the restoration of Switzerland as a confederation of states, conflicts between Catholics and Protestants arose again, although popular uprisings after 1830 led many cantons to adopt liberal constitutions which granted religious freedom. In 1845, two Catholic cantons of central Switzerland, namely Fribourg and Valais, formed a separate league, the Sonderbund, which opposed Protestants and liberals. As more cantons joined the Protestant and liberal faction than the Sonderbund, the general diet of the cantons asked for the dissolution of the latter. A civil war, the Sonderbund War, ensued in 1847, and it resulted in the defeat of the Catholic forces and in the establishment of Switzerland as a federal republic in 1848, under the Swiss Federal Constitution.

The constitution of 1848 declared Switzerland a multilingual and multireligious country; freedom of conscience was recognised as a fundamental right, though only for Christians. However, the cantons continued to have responsibility over the detailed regulation of the relations between church and state, and this led to differing systems, ranging from total separation to official churches (Landeskirchen) with a subordinated official recognition of other churches. (Note: Total separation of church and state was characteristic of the cantons of Geneva and Neuchâtel, while the Protestant cantons of Bern and Vaud and the Catholic cantons of Fribourg and Valais had a state church.) Legal discrimination against non-Christians such as Jews continued, as they had neither freedom of establishment nor freedom of worship, they could live only in the two "Jewish villages" of Endingen and Lengnau, and they could bury their dead only on a designated island in the Rhine; the bans on Jewish establishment and worship were abolished with revisions of the constitution respectively in 1866 and 1874.

=== 20th–21st centuries: abrogation of remaining restrictions and religious diversification ===
The revision of the constitution in 1874 had introduced some restrictions against Catholic institutions: the prohibition of the Society of Jesus (Jesuits), the prohibition of convents, and the prohibition of electing clerks in the highest federal authorities; these norms were abolished respectively in 1979, 1999 and 2001. The ban on Jesuits was abrogated from the constitution by popular vote, from which resulted that 54.9% of the Swiss were in favour of lifting the ban. At the same time, the 1874 revision of the constitution finally secured some fundamental secular principles: the separation of civil marriage from religious marriage and the separation of the teaching of religion from the rest of education. Over the following decades, freedom of worship and secular principles, combined with free movement of the population, gradually loosened the system of territorial exclusivity of religions which was characteristic of old Switzerland. However, in 1980, a popular vote to gauge the complete separation of church and state resulted in opposition to such change, with only 21.1% voting in support, so that the system of the Landeskirchen was retained.

In the early 20th century, Switzerland had an absolute majority of Protestants, about 60%, and a large population of Catholics, about 40%. After the World War II, the religious composition of the country began to change significantly; the immigration of workers from Italy and Spain sustained a growth of the Catholic population until 1970. Geneva, once the "Protestant Rome", in 1948 became the centre of world Christian ecumenism, hosting the World Council of Churches. Interest among locals brought to Switzerland Eastern religions, mostly Hinduism and Buddhism, first as intellectual systems, later established as practised religions by waves of immigration towards the end of the century. The same strain of comparative synthesis of world religions which in the 19th century had given rise to Theosophy and even earlier to Freemasonry (present among the elites in Switzerland since the 18th century), in the early 20th century led to the establishment of Anthroposophy in Switzerland by the Austrian occultist Rudolf Steiner. Starting in the mid-1970s, new waves of migration brought to Switzerland Orthodox Christian and Islamic populations from the Balkans, which increased in the 1990s with the welcoming of refugees fleeing the Yugoslav Wars. As a consequence, Islam grew to become today the second largest religion in the country after Christianity. At the same time, identification with, practice of Christianity, and membership in the traditional Christian churches, began to decline, first in the urban centres of Zürich, Basel and Geneva, and then also in the rural countrysides. Since then, Protestantism has declined to about two-tenths of the population, and Catholicism to about three-tenths of the population, while the proportion of Swiss people not believing in any religion has grown about thirty times.

== Legislation and freedom of religion ==
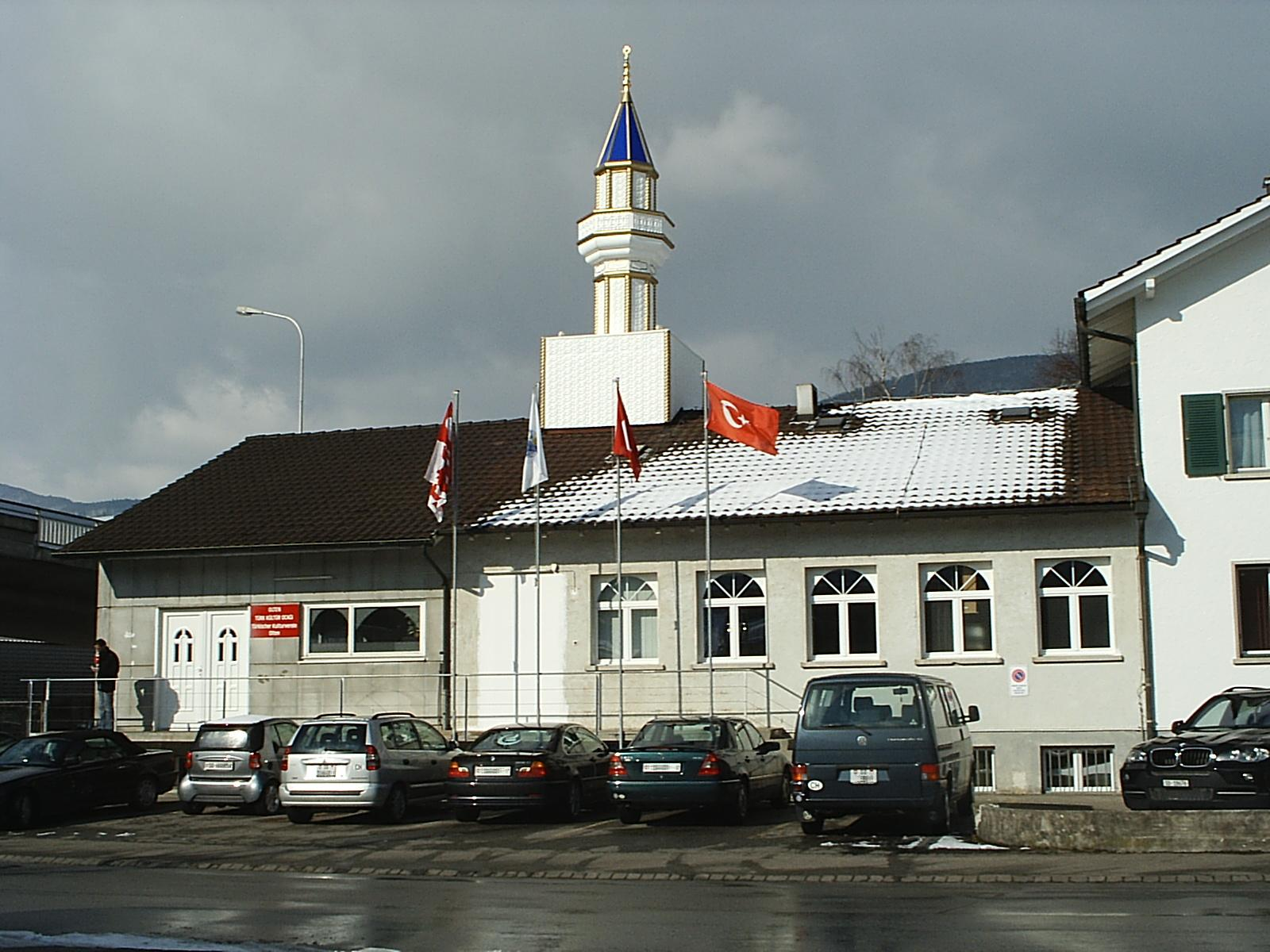
Mosque with minaret in Wangen bei Olten, canton of Solothurn. Inaugurated in July 2009, this mosque triggered that year's popular initiative which banned the construction of any further mosque towers in Switzerland.

The Swiss federal state does not have any official religion and does not favour any religion, and on the federal level there is not any administrative office which deals specifically with religious affairs, thus on such level the church and the state are fully separated. Although the preamble of the Swiss Federal Constitution begins In the name of God Almighty!, the invoked higher power is not to be intended in the Christian sense, but as the higher power of any religion. According to the Constitution, the relationship between the churches and the state has to be governed by the cantons themselves, so that the twenty-six cantons have twenty-six different systems of legislation on religious affairs. If a member of the Federal Council receives religious communities, this only happens in the form of a delegation of the representatives of all the country's major religious communities, so that no single religion has privileged access to the supreme federal authority. The majority of politicians keep a certain distance from religious communities, and political parties of religious character established by the religious communities themselves are marginal, so that religious ideas have little importance in the contemporary Swiss political process.

Law defines that Swiss public schools must be religiously neutral, and that the teaching of religious studies in public schools must not identify unilaterally with any religion or proselytise for it. Moreover, religious symbols are prohibited from being displayed by public schools and public school officials, be it crucifixes in classrooms or headscarves of Muslim female teachers. The state allows religious or philosophical communities to establish confessional private school, though they are still supervised by the state, which imposes certain requirements and conducts inspections; there are private Protestant, Catholic, Montessori, Waldorf (Anthroposophical), Jewish schools, and plans for Islamic schools.

The Article 15 of the Constitution protects as fundamental rights of individual citizens the belief in any religion or unbelief in any religion, and the performance of religious cult activities, alone or in community with others, and it makes clear that "no one shall be forced" to believe in a religion or participate in religious activities; the Article 36 also introduces a limitation to these rights if they threaten public order or if they encroach upon the basic rights of others, for example prohibiting ritual slaughter as it conflicts with Swiss animal laws and limiting certain public missionary practices. The Article 261 of the Swiss Criminal Code punishes the malicious disturbance or public mocking of religious beliefs and religious practices, and the dishonouring of locations and objects of worship.

While the federal state is completely neutral in matters of religion, each canton may recognise individual religious communities as juristic persons under public law due to their church sovereignty, thereby subjecting them to better conditions than unrecognised religious communities — it is the case of the Landeskirchen. The use of cantonal taxes to support cantonal churches has been ruled legal by the Federal Supreme Court, even though they are collected from juristic persons (e.g. corporations) of which irreligious citizens or citizens of unrecognised religions are shareholders.

Some observers have identified persisting discrimination against Jews and Muslims in Switzerland; while cases of harassment have mostly been verbal, after 2016 there were a few reports of physical assault against Jews, and Muslim cemeteries were targets of vandalism. In a referendum of November 2009, 57.5% of Swiss voters approved a popular initiative which prohibited the construction of minarets as part of Swiss Islamic mosques (though the four existing minarets of mosques in Zürich, Geneva, Winterthur and Wangen bei Olten were not affected retroactively and remained in place).

== See also ==
Media related to Religion in Switzerland at Wikimedia Commons

- Religion in Germany
- Religion in Liechtenstein
- Religion in Austria
- Religion in Europe
- Federation of Evangelical Lutheran Churches in Switzerland and the Principality of Liechtenstein
