= Muri statuette group =

Gallo-Roman bronze figurines

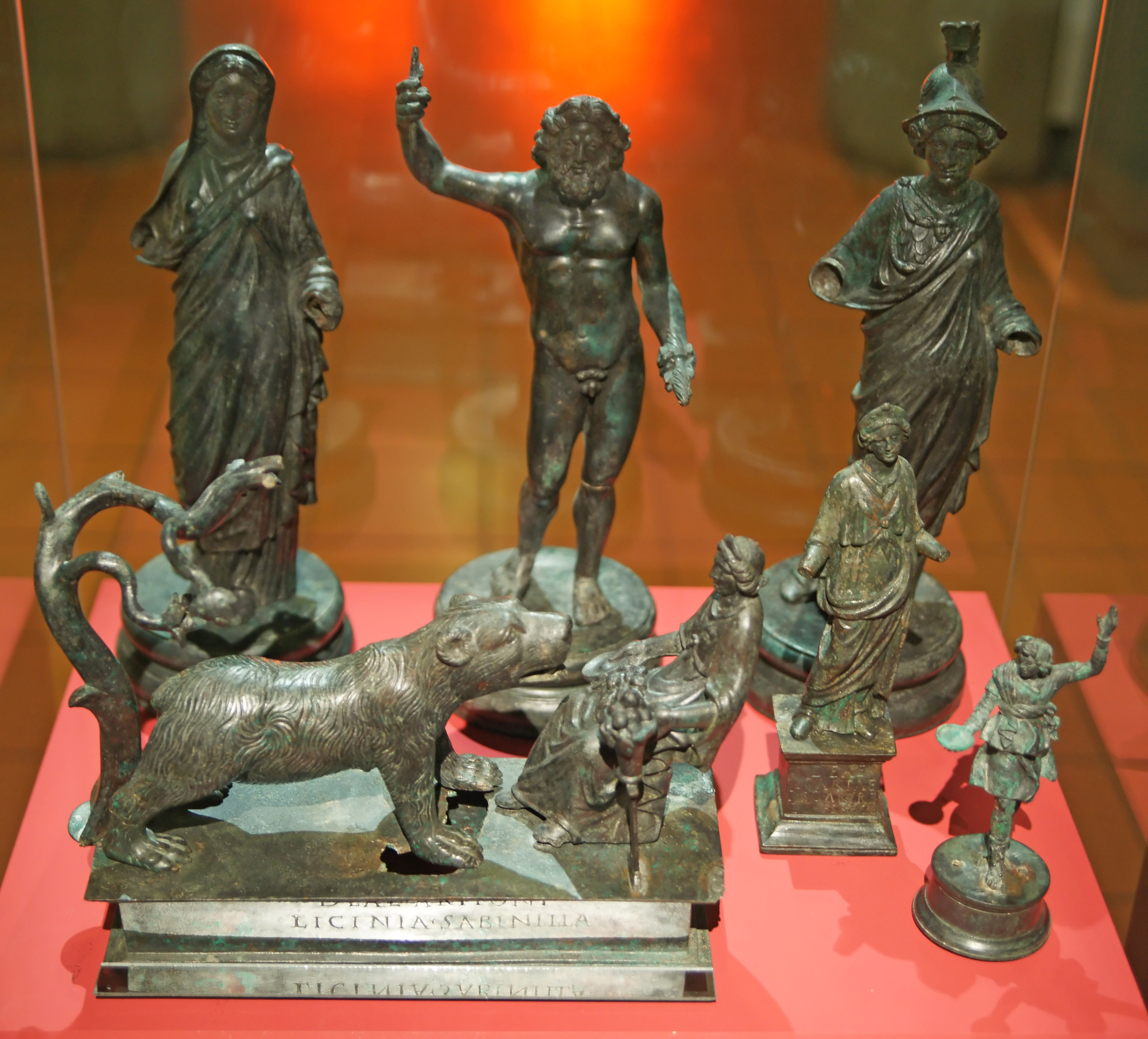
The statuettes exhibited in the Historical Museum of Bern.

The Muri statuette group is a group of six Gallo-Roman bronze figurines found in 1832 in Muri bei Bern, Switzerland. The group includes representations of the gods Jupiter, Juno, Minerva, Naria, Artio and of a Lar. The ensemble includes the only known representations of Artio and Naria, and is one of the more significant items in the collection of the Historical Museum of Bern.

== History ==
The statues are believed to be the idols worshiped at the temple of the regio Arurensis – the religious association of the region of the river Aar – whose name is inscribed on the pedestal of the Naria statue. The temple belonged to a large Roman estate. At an unknown time, probably to protect them against some threat, the statues were removed from the temple, locked in a chest and brought to a nearby building in whose ruins they were found 1,500 years later, in May 1832.

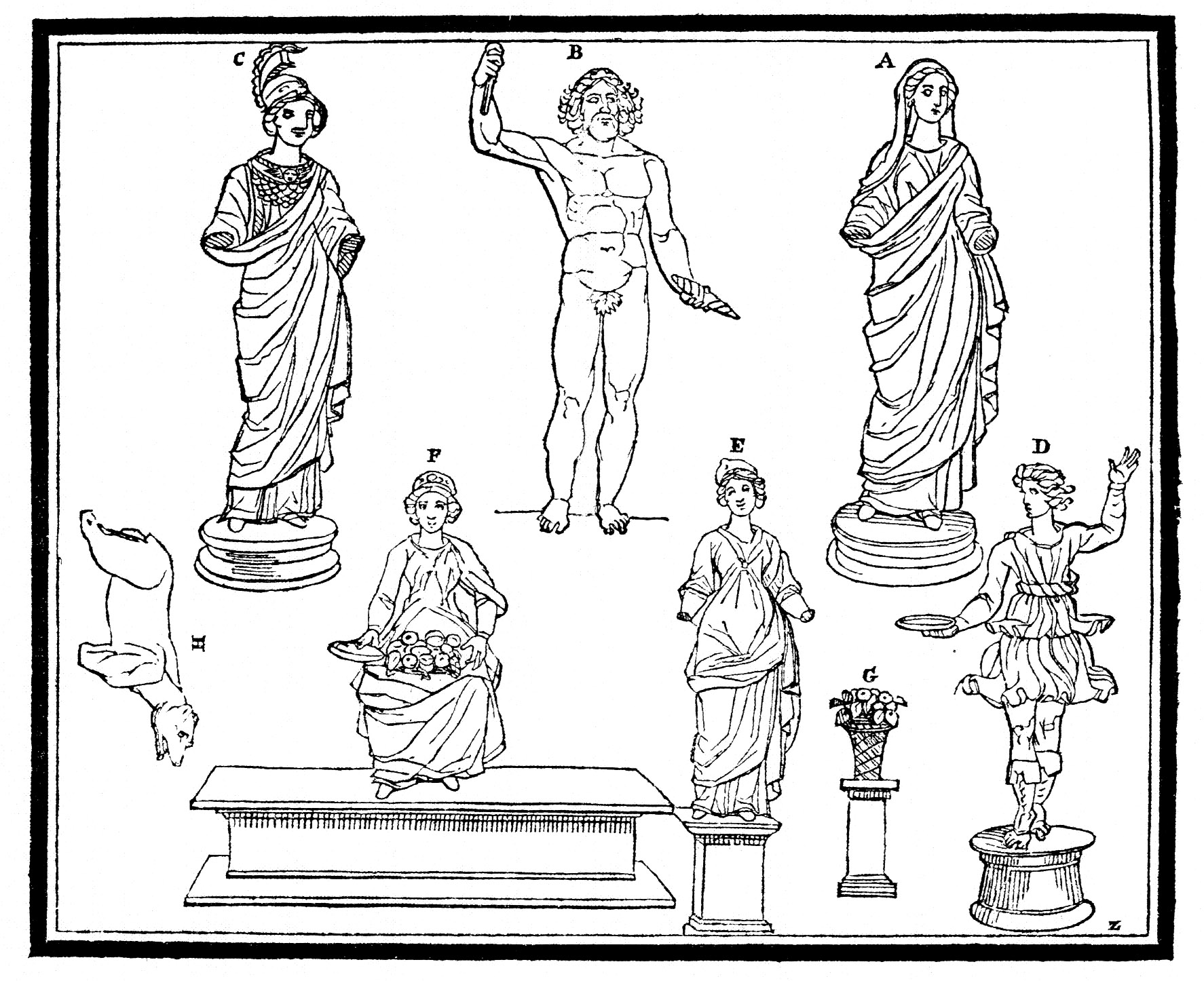
The statues as depicted in the 1832 Hinkender Bote.

Together with a number of household effects from the Roman period, the statues were found during an excavation for a new garden for the parsonage of Muri. Part of the decorative fittings and the iron key of the chest were also unearthed, but the key was later lost. The find was reported, together with drawings of the statues, in the Hinkender Bote, the main regional periodical of the time. The find soon drew a crowd of interested visitors, and the cantonal government dispatched one of its members, Regierungsrat Lohner, to inspect the find. After lengthy negotiations with the parson, the government acquired the statues after paying a finder's fee of 400 Berne franks.

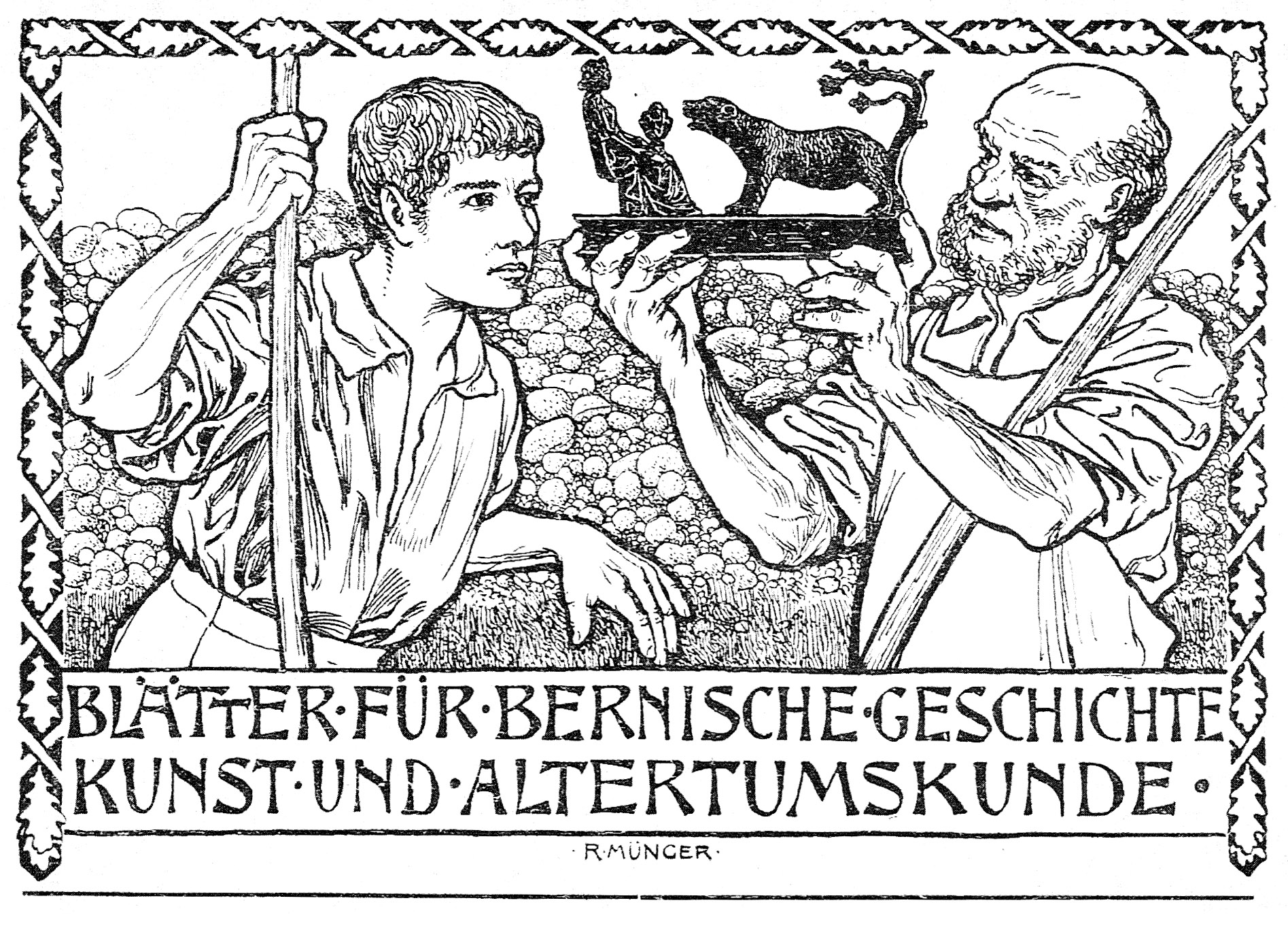
Rudolf Münger's drawing.

The group was put on display in various government rooms until it was acquired by the Historical Museum of Bern, where it is now exhibited. From 1905 on, a drawing of Artio and the bear by Rudolf Münger was pictured on the title sheet of the journal of the Bernese historical society, Blätter für bernische Geschichte, Kunst und Altertumskunde. This helped to establish Artio in the public consciousness as a particularly Bernese bear goddess, which fit with the tradition of the bear as Berne's heraldic animal and namesake.

== Description ==
The deities belong to two different religious traditions, attesting to the fusion of Roman and Gallic practices of worship in Switzerland in the Roman era: Jupiter, Juno and Minerva, the Capitoline Triad, are Roman gods, as is the Lar, while Artio and Naria are Romanized Celtic goddesses of regional significance.

The matching style of the five main statues (Jupiter, Juno, Minerva, Naria and the human Artio) indicates that they were made by the same bronze caster, probably in the late second century AD somewhere in western Switzerland. The Lare appears to have been made in Italy in the first century AD.

=== Artio ===
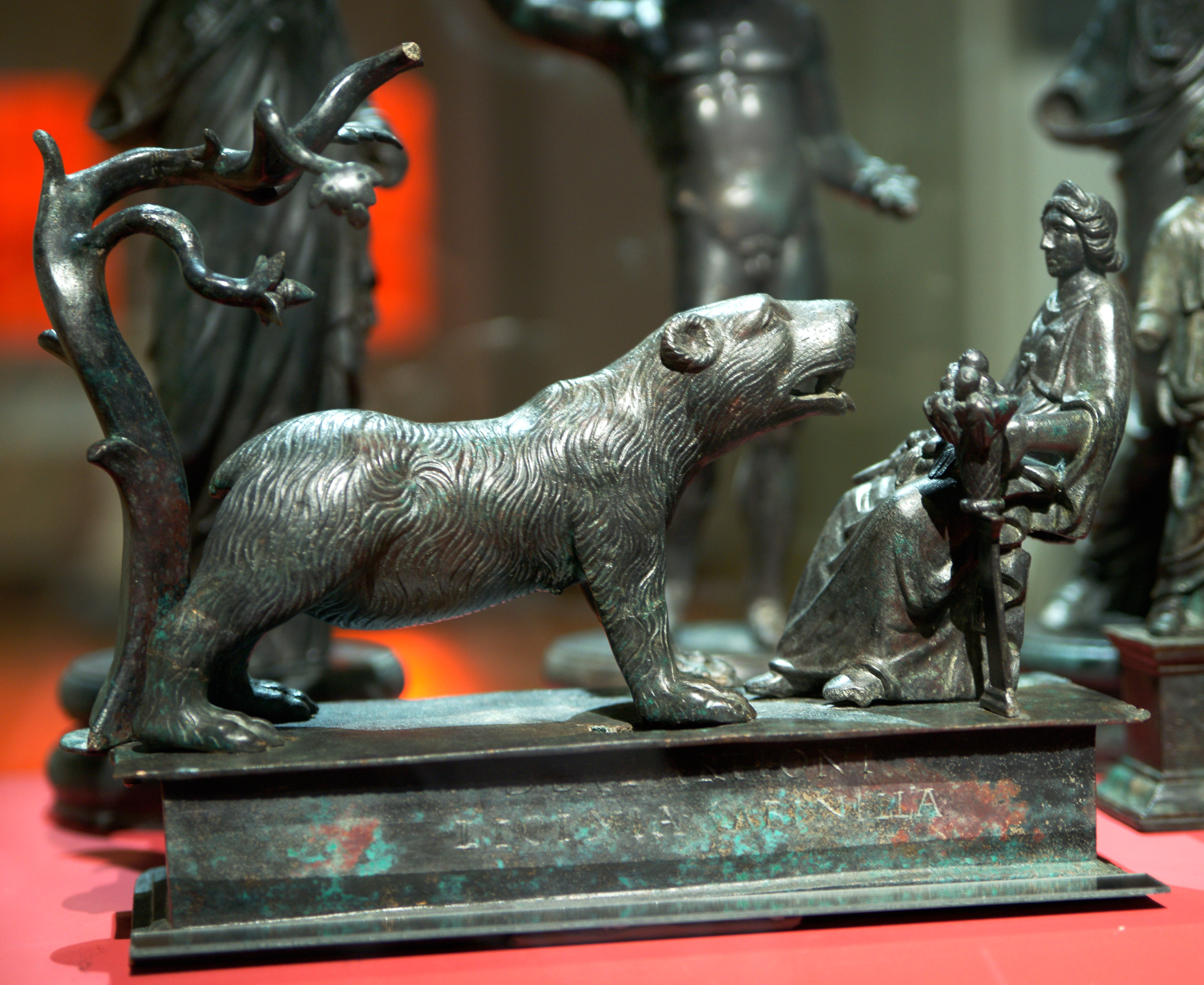
Artio as bear and woman

The two figures of Artio are the most famous bronzes of Roman Switzerland, and the only known representation of a Gallo-Roman deity in both human and animal form.

==== Elements ====
The dominating element of the group is the she-bear, Artio in her animal form, 21 centimetres (8.3 in) long. The taut, muscular body and open mouth convey the great animal's tense attention, and the structure of her fur is realistically suggested by carefully engraved lines. The bear is accompanied by a bronze tree, highly stylized and botanically indeterminable.

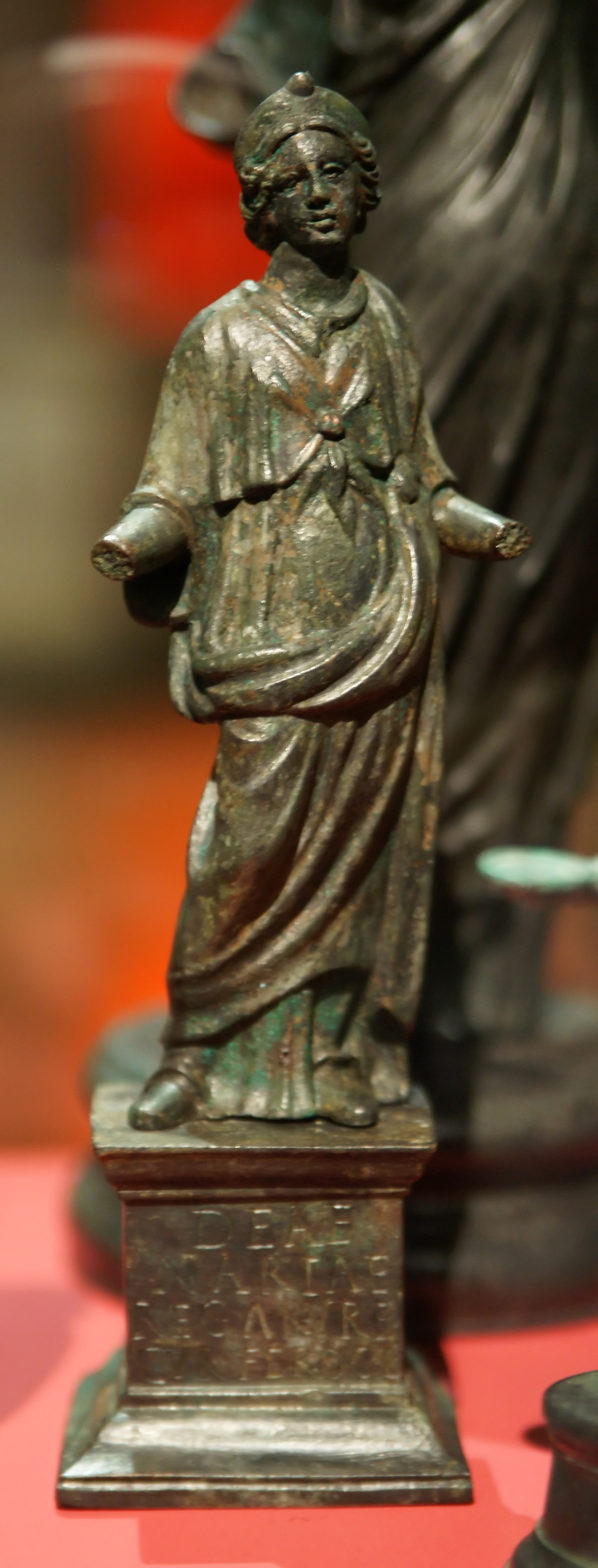
Naria

The human Artio was originally seated on a throne that is now lost. She wears a sleeved dress, a heavy mantle over her left shoulder, and a diadem in her wrapped hair. A high basket filled with fruit and grain, on a slender pillar, hides the wreath of fruits in her lap and the sacrificial bowl in her right hand from view. This, and also the lack of any accoutrements associated with a bear goddess, suggests that this figure was originally conceived as a solitary representation of a goddess of vegetation or agriculture, which was later repurposed – together with the bear – as a representation of Artio.

The pedestal bears the inscription,

Deae Artioni
Licinia Sabinilla

that is, "To the Goddess Artio, from Licinia Sabinilla." About the sponsor of the group nothing is known but her name, which is Italic in origin but was also widely used in Gaul.

==== Configuration ====
At the time of their discovery, the individual elements of the group – pedestal, bear, woman, tree and basket – were separated from each other, making their configuration a matter of conjecture. In the 19th century, the human Artio was displayed alone in the center of the pedestal, facing forward. J. J. Bachofen, examining the statues in 1860, first recognized the bear as female. Inspired by the Muri statuettes, his 1863 monograph about bears in ancient religion, Der Bär in den Religionen des Alterthums, postulated that the apparently Celtic name Artio was related to the Greek word for bear, arktos, and that the two statues were related: the bear representing Dea Artio in her animal form.

The discovery of several soldering joints on the pedestal by Paul Vionnet in 1899 confirmed that the bear had indeed been affixed to the pedestal, and allowed a reconstruction of what are now believed to be the two configurations in which the bronze elements were originally displayed. It appears that Artio's bear form was initially alone on the left side of the pedestal, facing the tree at the right end, while an unknown object was placed on the semicircular protrusion on the left side of the pedestal. At some later time, the tree was moved to that protrusion behind the bear, making room for the newly added statue of the human Artio, her basket and her now missing throne. This was probably done at the behest of the statue's sponsor, Licinia Sabinilla, and the pedestal also probably received its inscription at that time, because it is unlikely that the bear alone would have been titulated as Dea Artio. The bronzes have since been displayed in this final position.

==== Measurements ====
The Artio group (Inv. no. 16170/16210) weighs 5,308 grams (11.702 lb). The pedestal is 28.6 centimetres (11.3 in) long and the tree is 19 centimetres (7.5 in) high. The body of the bear, the pedestal, and the human body up to the shoulders are hollow.
