= Berne frank =

Former Swiss currency

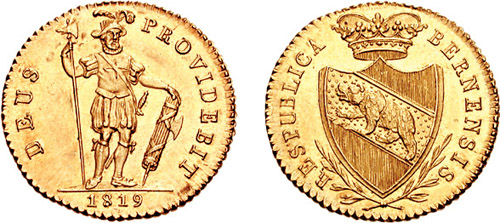
16 Franken (Duplone

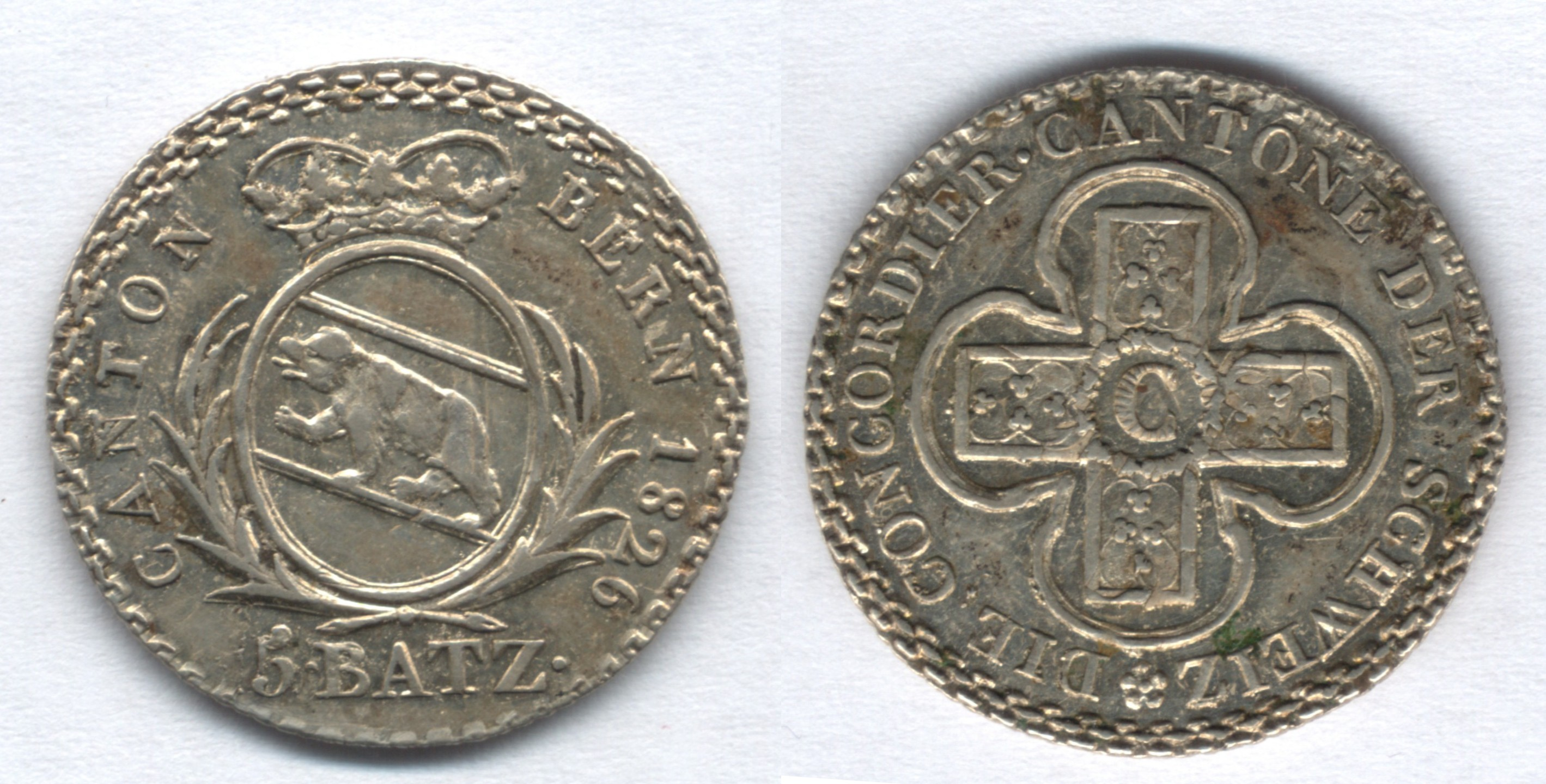
5 Batzen, 1826

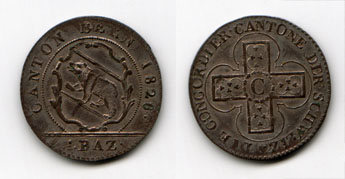
1 Batzen, 1826

The Frank was the currency of the Swiss canton of Bern between 1798 and 1850. It was subdivided into 10 Batzen, each of 10 Rappen. It was worth 1/4th the French silver écu or 6.67 g fine silver.

== History ==
The Frank was the currency of the Helvetian Republic from 1798, replacing the Thaler in Bern. The Helvetian Republic ceased issuing coins in 1803. Bern issued coins between 1808 and 1836. In 1850, the Swiss franc was introduced, with 1 Berne Frank = 1.4597 Swiss francs.

== Coins ==
Billon coins were issued in denominations of 1, 2, 2 1/2 and 5 Rappen, 1/2 and 1 Batzen, with silver coins for 2 1/2 and 5 Batzen and 1, 2 and 4 Franken. Bern also counterstamped various French écu and 6 livres for use as 40 Batzen coins.
