= Artio =

Gaulish bear goddess

Artio was a bear goddess in the religion of the ancient Celts. Her name comes from the Gaulish word for 'bear', arto-, and she is attested among two Gaulish peoples, the Helvetii and the Treveri. She is known from two Latin dedications and from a Roman-period bronze statuette group found at Muri, near Bern, which shows her seated before a bear. The bronze is now in the Bern Historical Museum.

== Name ==
The goddess is attested in the dative form Artioni. According to Karin Stüber, the genuine Gaulish stem was *artiion-, with a nominative *artiiū, and the recorded Artioni is a latinised dative.

The name Artio is formed on the Proto-Celtic o-stem *arto- ('bear'), which survives in Old Irish art and Middle Welsh arth. The word continues the inherited Indo-European name for the bear *h₂ŕ̥tḱos, seen also in Latin ursus and Ancient Greek arktos.

The bear-word is frequent in Gaulish personal names, and its later Celtic reflexes mean both 'bear' and 'warrior'. In Old Irish, art no longer denoted the animal but was used for a warrior in a figurative sense, and Bernhard Maier notes that the same cannot be ruled out for the older Gaulish names. Because the name simply means 'bear', Miranda Aldhouse-Green observes that the goddess and the animal are almost identified with each other, much as the name of the horse goddess Epona points directly to her animal.

== Iconography ==
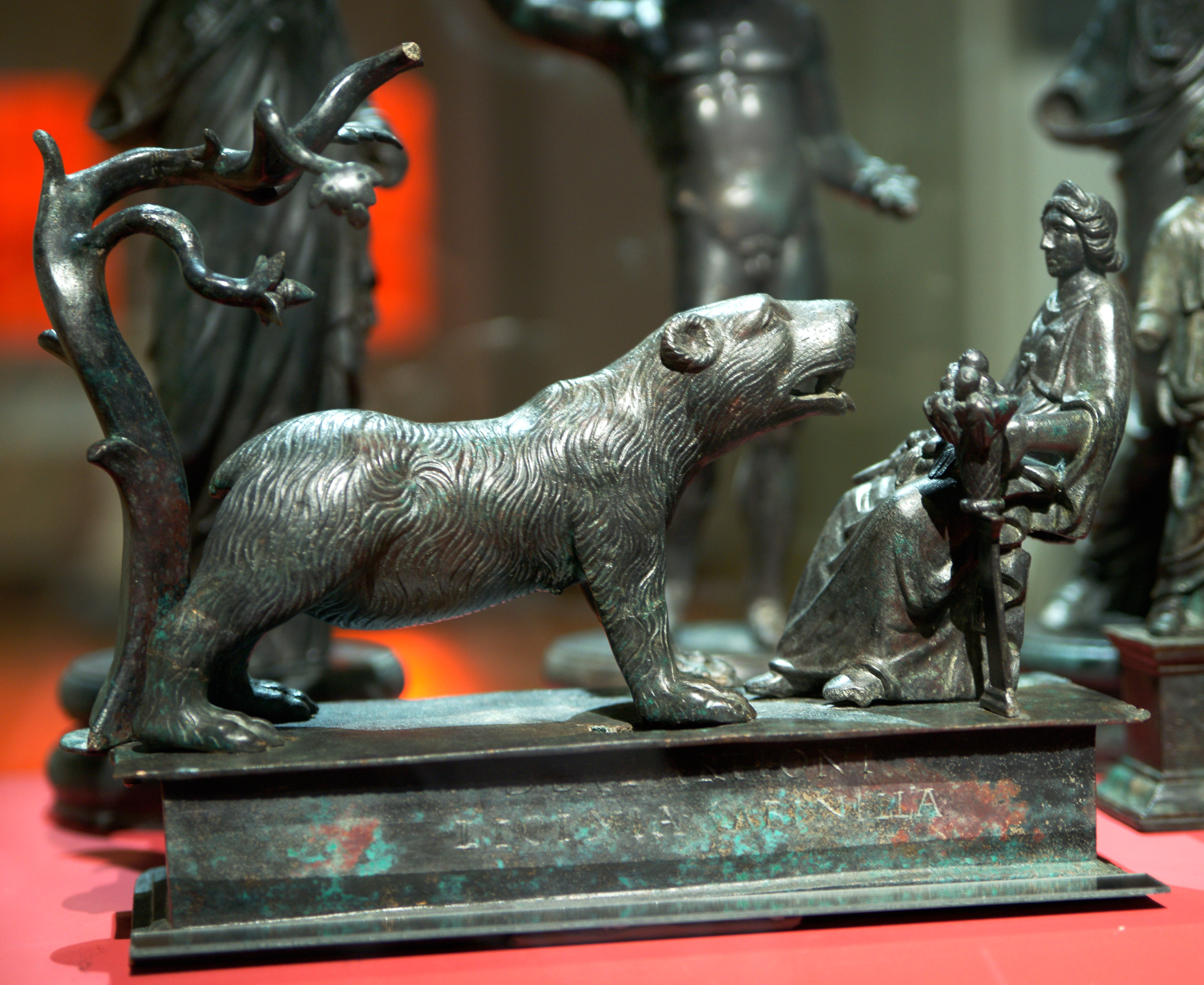
The goddess Artio as depicted in the Muri statuette group.

The main depiction of Artio is a Gallo-Roman bronze statuette from the Muri statuette group. It was found at Muri, near Bern, in the former territory of the Helvetii. It consists of a seated female figure and a large bear, with a tree behind the animal. The goddess holds a patera of fruit, and the bear faces her, leaning forward as if to take the fruit or to threaten her. The figure is about 20 centimetres high, and Bernhard Maier describes the animal as a she-bear. A dedication to the goddess is inscribed on the base below the figures. The group is now held in the Bern Historical Museum.

== Interpretation ==
The name identifies Artio with the bear, and scholars have read her as a patron of bears. Jan de Vries preferred this connection over other proposed etymologies and suggested that hunters may have invoked her as a protectress of the animal. Miranda Aldhouse-Green proposed that her role was ambivalent, in that she guarded bears but may also have protected the hunters and travellers who risked meeting them in the forest. On this reading she was a mediator between people and wild animals, one who could secure both a successful hunt and the survival of the species.

Artio is one of a small number of Celtic goddesses with a connection to hunting who are attested by inscriptions or images, alongside Abnoba and Arduinna. Of these, only Abnoba is expressly equated with the Roman goddess Diana in inscriptions. The linguist Vittore Pisani considered identifying the Celtic hunting goddess behind the Artemis of Arrian's Cynegeticus with Artio, though the proposal remains uncertain.

The bear was not tied to female divinity alone. The epithet Artaios, which also contains the bear-word, is attested for Mercury at Beaucroissant in the Isère. The goddess Andarta of the Vocontii bears a name that has likewise been linked to the bear-word and glossed as 'great bear', but her character is disputed, and she has also been read as a goddess of war and identified with Andraste, the goddess invoked by Boudica. A closer parallel to Artio is Arduinna, the goddess of the Ardennes, shown as a huntress mounted on a boar. Like Artio, she was patroness both of her animal and of those who hunted it. The northern British god-name Matunus may go back to a different Celtic word for 'bear', Irish math, but the connection is uncertain.

== Epigraphy ==
Artio is attested by two Latin inscriptions. The dedication on the base of the Muri group reads Deae Artioni Licinia Sabinilla ('for the goddess Artio, from Licinia Sabinilla'), the offering of a woman with a Roman name to a goddess with a Celtic one.

The other inscription is cut into a rock face in the gorge near Ernzen, (Note: Green (1992) places this inscription in the valley at Bollendorf, in the same area of the Sauer gorge.) in the territory of the Treveri, and reads Artioni Biber. For Karin Stüber, the worship of a goddess with a Celtic name near Bern shows that the region had a Celtic-speaking population before it was colonised by Rome.

Text	Find-spot	Divine name(s)	Translation	Reference	Comments
Deae Artioni Licinia Sabinilla	Bern	Artio	To the goddess Artio, Licinia Sabinilla (set this up).	CIL XIII, 5160	On bronze. The dedicant is a woman, Licinia Sabinilla. Also published as ILS 4698.
Artioni Biber	Ernzen (Treveri territory)	Artio	To Artio, Biber (set this up).	CIL XIII, 4113	On stone. CSIR Deutschland IV.3, 25a.

== See also ==
- Bear worship
