= Naria =

Gallo-Roman goddess

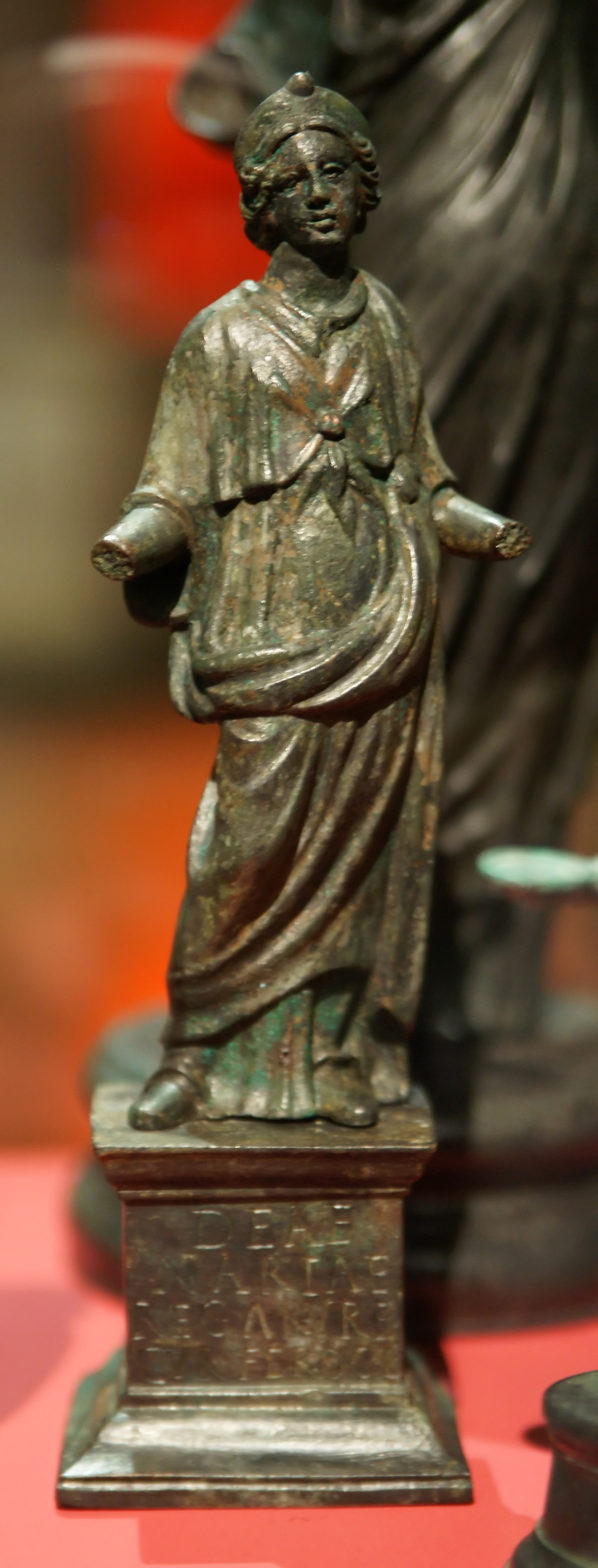
The statuette of Naria from the Muri statuette group.

Naria was a goddess in Gallo-Roman religion who appears to have been venerated only in what is now the western part of Switzerland. She was only mentioned twice in a Gallo-Roman context, and her nature and responsibilities remain obscure.

== Etymology ==
The name Naria is thought to originate from the Gaulish nertos, strength. The epithet Nousantia could be a contraction of nauson, ship, and anatia, soul.

== Extant depictions ==
Naria is mentioned only twice in known inscriptions from the Gallo-Roman era.

One, on a stone altar from Cressier, reads Nariae Novsantiae T. Frontin. Hibernvs V.S.L.M, that is: "To Naria Nousantia, Titus Frontinius Hibernus willingly and deservedly fulfilled his vow". The epithet "Nousantia" is otherwise unknown.

The other inscription is on the base of a statuette from the Muri statuette group. That inscription, Deae Nariae Reg(io) Arvre(nsis) Cvr(ante) Feroc(e) L(iberto), translates as: "The Aar area association dedicated this to the goddess Naria; the freedman Ferox served as curator."

The Muri statuette is also the only known depiction of Naria. It shows her in a long-sleeved dress and with a diadem in her hair. The hands which held her divine attributes are missing. This depiction of Naria follows a generic style then used in Italy mostly for depictions of the goddess of luck, Fortuna. This indicates that Naria might also have been conceived of as a goddess of good luck and blessings.
