= Franke =

Franke is both a German-language surname and a given name.

== Surname ==
- Alfred Franke (1918–1942), German fighter pilot
- Andre Franke (born 1978), American German geneticist
- Andreas Franke (born 1954), German sports shooter
- Angela Franke (born 1957), German swimmer
- Anselm Franke (born 1978), German curator and writer
- Arthur Franke (1909–1992), East German policeman and Military Intelligence Chief
- Bernd Franke (born 1948), German footballer
- Bernd Franke (composer) (born 1959), German composer
- Bette Franke (born 1989), Dutch fashion model
- Bill Franke (born 1937), American businessman
- Bob Franke (born 1947), American folk singer and song writer
- Chris Franke, American poet
- Christoph Franke (born 1944), German footballer and coach
- Christopher Franke (born 1953), German musician/composer in Tangerine Dream
- Detlef Franke (1952–2007), German Egyptologist
- Dominik Franke (born 1998), German footballer
- Donald T. Franke (1921–2013), American jurist and legislator
- Edgar Franke (born 1960), German politician
- Egon Franke (fencer) (1935–2022), Polish Olympic fencer
- Egon Franke (politician) (1913–1995), German politician (SPD)
- Elsa Thiemann (née Franke, 1910–1981), German photographer
- Eric Franke (born 1989), German bobsledder
- Ernst Ludwig Franke (1886–1948), Austrian painter
- Fabian Franke (born 1989), German footballer
- Friedrich Wilhelm Franke (1862–1932), German organist
- Garance Franke-Ruta (born 1972), American writer and editor
- Gerhard Franke (1926–2002), German painter
- Guillaume Franke (born 1987), German rugby union player
- Günther Franke (1900–1976), German gallery owner, art dealer and collector
- Gustav Franke (born 1937), German International motorcycle trials rider
- Gustave H. Franke (1888–1953), American major general
- Harry F. Franke Jr. (1922–2012), American politician
- Heinz Franke (born 1928), German sports shooter
- Herbert Franke (sinologist) (1914–2011), German sinologist, co-author of the Cambridge History of China
- Herbert W. Franke (1927–2022), Austrian science fiction writer
- Ivana Franke (born 1973), Croatian artist
- Jay Anthony Franke (born 1972), American actor, voice actor and musician
- Jens Franke (born 1964), German mathematician
- Joachim Franke (1940–2024), German ice hockey player
- Josef Franke (1876–1944), German architect
- Katherine Franke, American legal scholar
- Keith Franke (1953–1988), American professional wrestler known as Adrian Adonis
- Keith Franke (politician) (born 1970), American politician
- Klaus Franke (born 1948), German footballer
- Marcel Franke (born 1993), German footballer
- Mario Franke (born 1968), German gymnast
- Matthieu Franke (born 1985), German rugby union player
- Megan Loef Franke, American scholar of mathematics education
- Nikki Franke (born 1951), American fencer and fencing coach
- Noah Franke (born 1995), American soccer player
- Otto Franke (sinologist) (1863–1946), German diplomat, sinologist, and historian
- Otto Franke (politician) (1877–1953), German politician and trade unionist
- Paul Franke (figure skater) (1888–1950), German figure skater
- Paul Franke (tenor) (1917–2011), American operatic tenor
- Richard Walter Franke (1905–1973), German archivist
- Rolf Franke (born 1967), Dutch basketball player and coach
- Ruby Franke (born 1982), American former family vlogger YouTuber, aggravated child abuser
- Sebastian Franke (born 1963), German rower
- Shari Franke (born 2003), American former vlogger, author
- Stéphane Franke (1964–2011), German long distance runner
- Thomas Franke (born 1988), German football manager and player
- Valentin Franke (1926–2025), Soviet/Russian theoretical physicist
- Victor Franke (1865–1936), German military officer
- Werner Franke (1940–2022), German professor and biologist
- William B. Franke (1894–1979), American financial manager, U.S. Secretary of the Navy 1959–1961
- William Franke (philosopher) (born 1956), American academic and philosopher
- Wolfgang Franke (1912–2007), German sinologist
- Yannick Franke (born 1996), Dutch basketball player

== Given name ==
- Franke Onsrud (1885–1945), Norwegian sports shooter
- Franke Previte (born 1946), American composer
- Franke Rupert (1888–1971), Austrian engraver
- Franke Sloothaak (born 1958), German equestrian
- Franke Wilmer (born 1950), American academic and politician

== See also ==
- Franke family (Bydgoszcz), Prussian family
- Franke (company), Swiss manufacturing company
- Franke and the Knockouts, American band in the early 1980s
- Franke Institute for the Humanities at the University of Chicago
- Franke mine, copper mine in the Atacama Desert, Chile
- Francke, surname
- Franken (disambiguation)
