= Volkmar Andreae =

Swiss composer and conductor

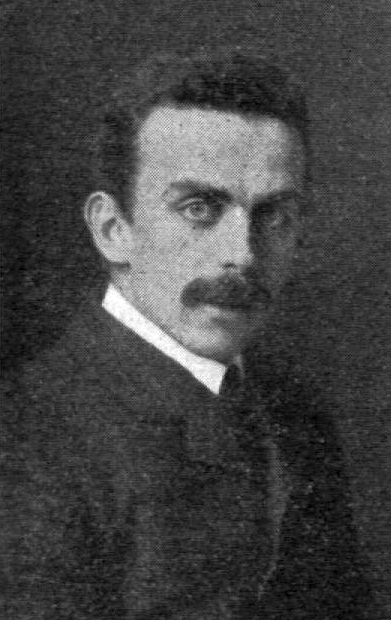
Volkmar Andreae in 1909

Volkmar Andreae (5 July 1879 – 18 June 1962) was a Swiss conductor and composer.

== Life and career ==
Andreae was born in Bern. He received piano instruction as a child and his first lessons in composition with Karl Munzinger. From 1897 to 1900, he studied at the Cologne Conservatory and was a student of Fritz Brun, Franz Wüllner, Isidor Seiss and Friedrich Wilhelm Franke. In 1900 he was a soloist tutor at the Munich Hofoper. In 1902 he took over the leadership of the Mixed Choir of Zürich (Der Gemischte Chor Zürich), where he remained until 1949, also leading the Stadtsängerverein Winterthur from 1902 to 1914 and the Männerchor Zürich from 1904 to 1914.

From 1906 to 1949, he led the Tonhalle-Orchester Zürich; and from 1914 to 1939, the Conservatory of Zürich. (He was offered the opportunity of succeeding Gustav Mahler as conductor of the New York Philharmonic Orchestra in 1911, but he declined.) Later he worked as freelance composer in Vienna and worked internationally as a conductor (especially with the works of Anton Bruckner). He composed opera, symphony and chamber music, piano, violin, and oboe concertos, piano music, as well as choir music and songs. He died in Zürich.

He is mentioned in Chapter XXI of Thomas Mann's novel Doctor Faustus, where he is cited as conducting the Thirteen Brentano Lieder by the fictional composer Adrian Leverkühn. This fictional concert is said to have taken place in 1922 in the Tonhalle in Zürich.

His grandson is the conductor Marc Andreae, who recorded various of his grandfather's works for the Guild label.

== Works (selection) ==
=== Operas ===
- Ratcliff, opera (1914)
- Abenteuer des Casanova, opera (1924)

=== Orchestra ===
- Symphony in B♭ major (unpublished, WoO)
- Symphony No. 1 in F major (1900; recorded)
- Symphony No. 2 in C major, Op. 31 (1920; recorded)
- Sinfonische Fantasie, Op. 7
- Kleine Suite, Op. 27 (recorded)
- Notturno und Scherzo, Op. 30 (1919; recorded)
- Music for Orchestra, Op. 35 (1921; recorded)
- Li-Tai-Pe, Eight Chinese songs for tenor and orchestra, Op. 37 (recorded)
- La cité sur la montagne, festival music (1942)

=== Concertante works ===
- Piano Concerto in D (1898; recorded)
- Konzertstück in B minor for piano and orchestra (1900; recorded)
- Rhapsody for violin and orchestra, Op. 32 (1920; recorded)
- Violin concerto, Op. 40 (1935; recorded)
- Concertino for Oboe and Orchestra, Op. 42 (recorded)
- Li-Tai-Pe, Eight Chinese songs for tenor and orchestra (1931; recorded) – inspired by the 8th-century poet Li Tai-peh (Li Taibai, aka Li Bai)

=== Choral works ===
- Vater unser for mezzo-soprano, women's choir and organ
- Das Göttliche for tenor, choir and orchestra (1900)
- Charons Nachen for soloists, choir, and orchestra (1901)
- Schutzgeister, cantata (1904)

=== Chamber music ===
- Piano Trio No. 1 in F minor, Op. 1 (recorded)
- Violin Sonata in D major, Op. 4 (recorded)
- String Quartet No. 1 in B♭ major, Op. 9 (recorded)
- Piano Trio No. 2 in E♭ major, Op. 14 (recorded)
- Six piano pieces for two hands, Op. 20 (recorded)
- String Trio in D minor, Op. 29 (recorded)
- Notturno and Scherzo, Op. 30 (recorded)
- String Quartet No. 2, Op. 33 (recorded)
- Quartet for Flute, Violin, Viola and Violoncello, Op. 43 (recorded)
