= Palau Nacional =

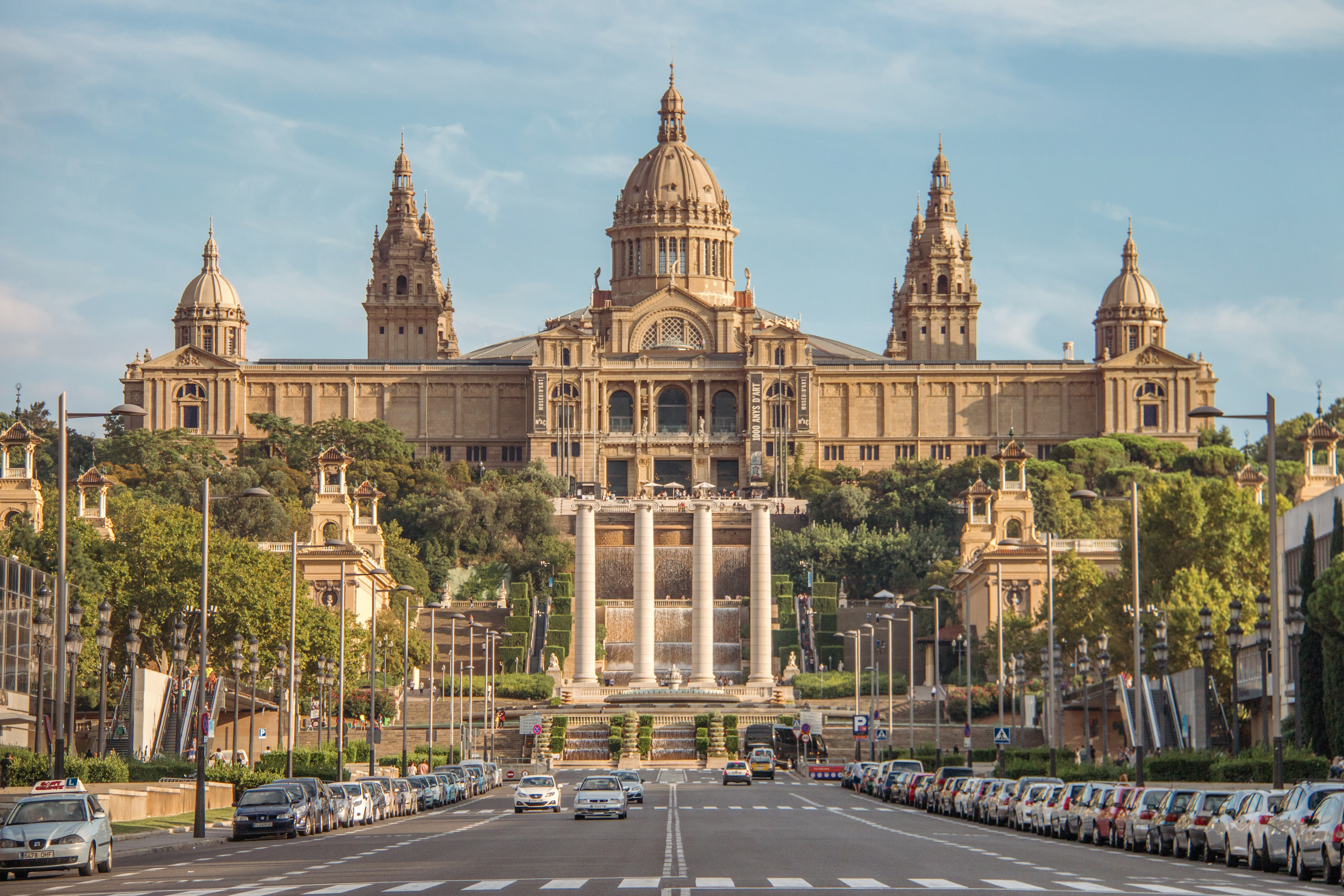
- Interactive map of the Palau Nacional area
- Alternative names: National Palace

General information
- Architectural style: Spanish Renaissance-inspired
- Location: Montjuïc, Barcelona
- Coordinates: 41°22′06″N 2°09′12″E
- Construction started: 30 June 1926

Technical details
- Size: 51,600 square meters

Design and construction
- Architects: Eugenio Cendoya and Enric Catà; Fountains by the palace are the work of Carles Buïgas.
- Known for: Site of the 1929 Barcelona International Exposition; Home to the National Art Museum of Catalonia

Renovating team
- Architects: Ramon Reventós (1934 renovation); Gae Aulenti (1960-1980s; Enric Steegman (1990 renovation); Josep Benedito (2000-4 renovation)

The Palau Nacional (Catalan for 'National Palace') is a building on the hill of Montjuïc in Barcelona. It was the main site of the 1929 International Exhibition. It was designed by Eugenio Cendoya and Enric Catà under the supervision of Pere Domènech i Roura. Since 1934 it has been home to the National Art Museum of Catalonia.

With a ground surface of 32,000 m^{2}, the Spanish Renaissance-inspired building has a rectangular floor plan flanked by two side and one rear square sections, with an elliptical dome in the centre. The fountains by the staircases leading to the palace are the work of Carles Buïgas.

Between 1996 and 2004, the palace was extended to accommodate the National Art Museum's entire collection of over 5,000 artworks.

== First projects of the Palau Nacional ==
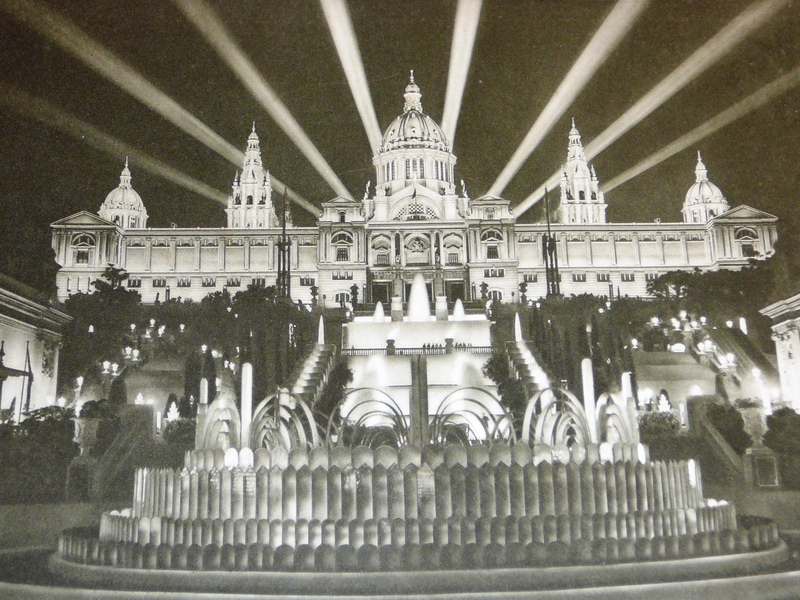
The inauguration of the Palau in 1929

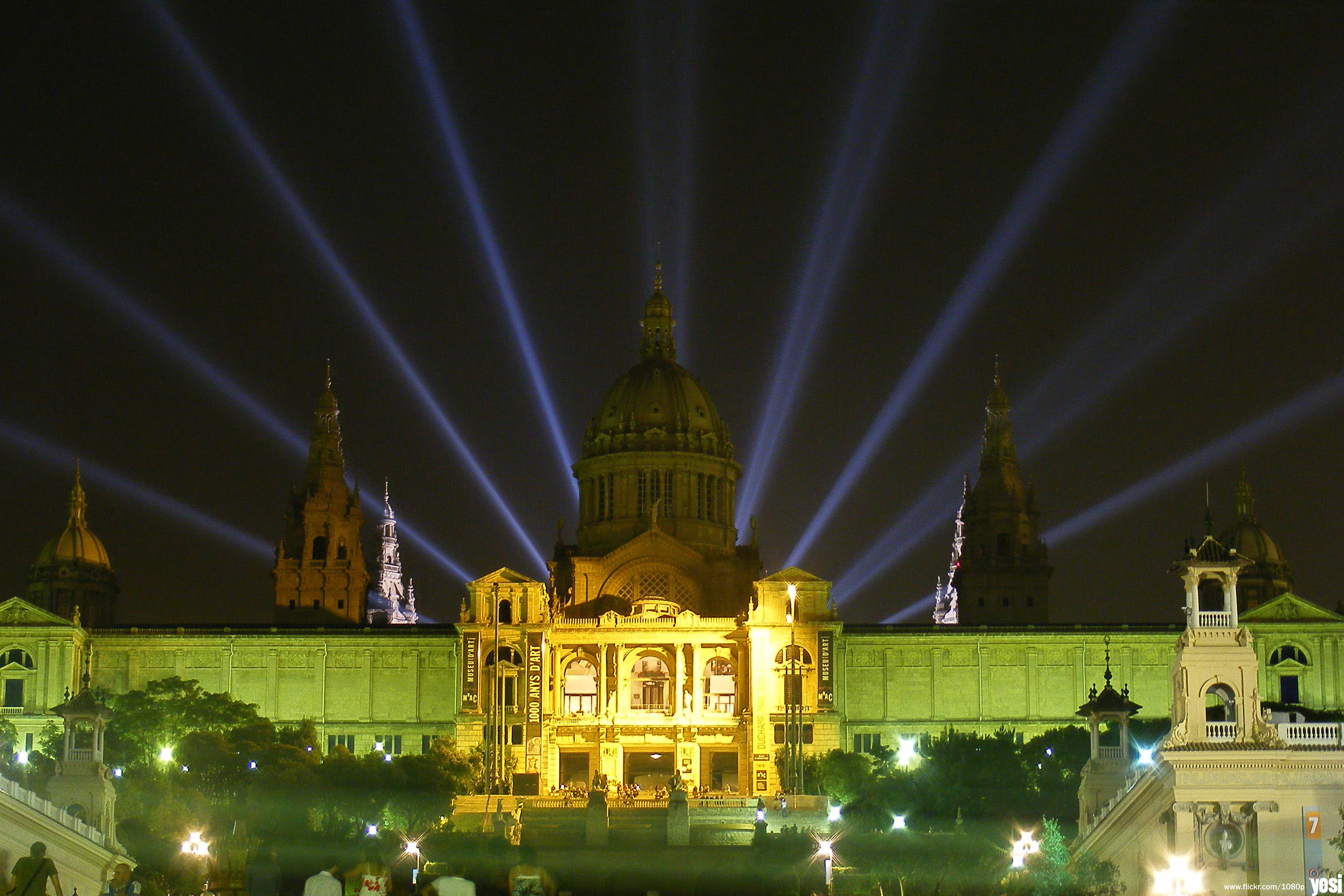
Night view of Palau Nacional

Ahead of the 1929 International Exhibition, Barcelona had already commenced urbanizing parts of Montjuïc. From the second half of the 19th century, projects were presented regarding the installation of public facilities in the area. Up until this time, Montjuïc had only been used for its resources: pockets of private properties and numerous quarries. The lack of roadways made it area difficult to access, however.

A project by Ildefons Cerdà and another by Josep Amargós in 1894 proposed to convert the mountain into a residential area. A similar later plan was Léon Jaussely's 1905 Pla d'Enllaços. Another idea for the celebration of the exhibition in Montjuïc was proposed in 1909 when Manuel Vega i March suggested that the culminating point of the development should be 'a great Temple of Art, a summary and compendium of our most prodigious knowledge'. Finally, in 1913, it was decided that Montjuïc would be the definite location for the Exhibition of Electric Industries (Exposició d'Indústries Electriques), promoted by the industry and the city council of Barcelona.

The initial plan proposed by architect Josep Puig i Cadafalch in 1915 was basic in design, depicting a large central avenue crowned by a rectangular palace with a great dome, the top of which had a statue of a winged Victory surrounded by eight towers. In 1920, the same architect designed a detailed project named Palau d'Art Antic (Palace of Ancient Art), which later became known as Palau dels Nacions (Palace of the Nations). In order to construct the dome, a system was conceived to include a combination of a concrete and geodesic dome structure. The construction of this design began in 1923. However, in September of the same year, the arrival of General Miguel Primo de Rivera to power brought on the dismissal of Puig i Cadafalch from his position as president of the Commonwealth of Catalonia and his subsequent distancing from the Exhibition project.

The distancing of Puig i Cadafalch from the project was not only for political reasons, but financial ones as well. In a document titled Advancement of the Budget of the Exhibition, the budget valued the Palace at 8,080,000 pesetas. Another reason for the new organizational committee to avoid Puig i Cadafalch's continuation was the transfer of the contract from the construction company Ingeniería y Construcciones to another company Construcciones y Pavimentos, contradicting the statement of conditions previously agreed. As a result, the new committee decided to suspend the construction works of the palace.

== Competition of 1924 ==
On 18 July 1924 the engineer Marià Rubió i Bellver, member of the organization and lawyer of J.M. Almirall Carbó, launched a competition of projects. The participation was open to all Spanish architects, who could present an individual project or one together with the proposal of a construction company. It was the latter option that gave way to the final winner. Ten projects in total were presented. That of José María Martín was rejected, as it was considered outside of the scope of the project. The nine successful entries were made public in January 1925:

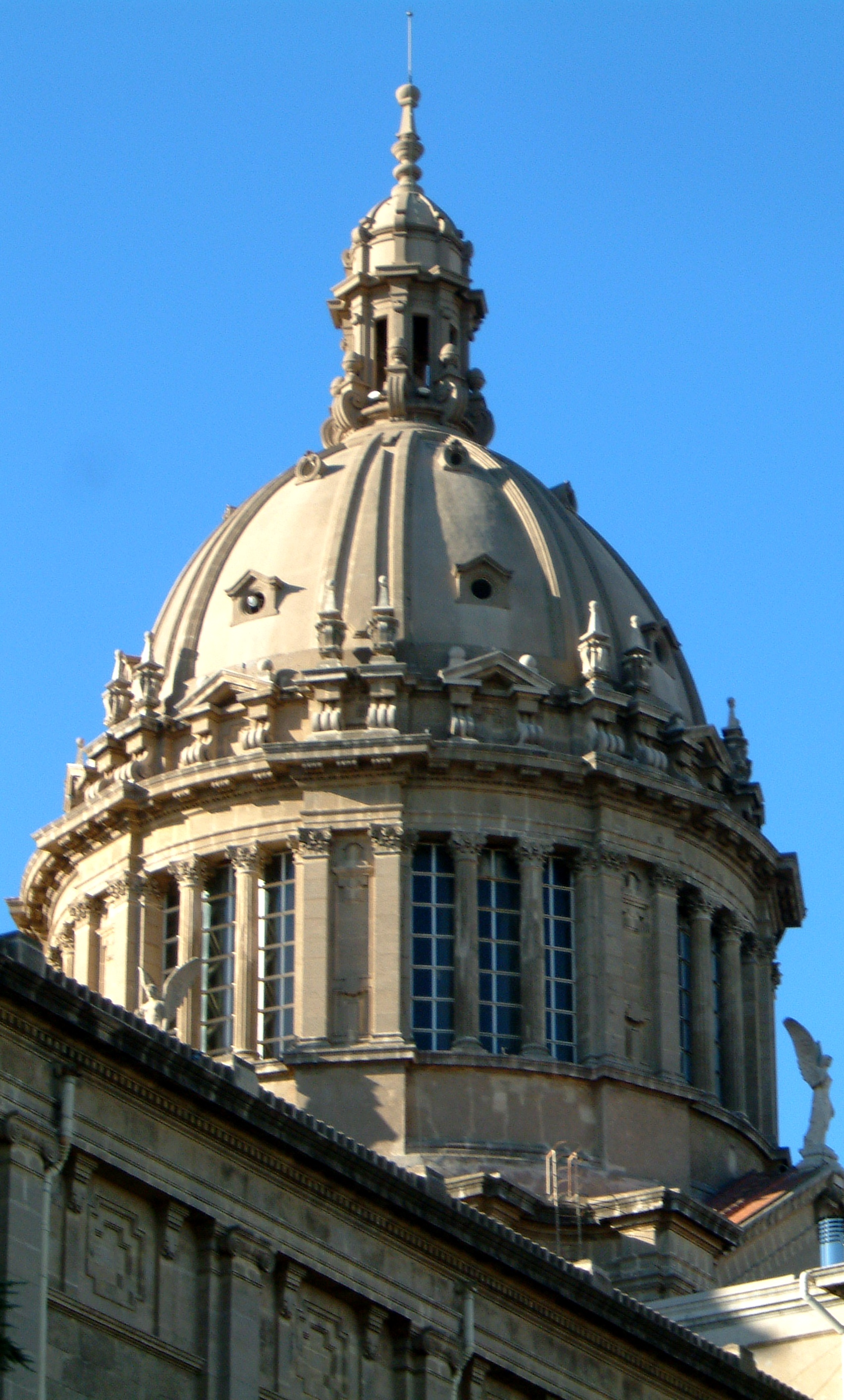
The great central dome of the Palau Nacional, a feature present in nearly all of the designs presented for the competition in 1924

- Benet Guitart i Trulls: The architect with the longest standing qualification, he proposed a structure made of iron that was based on an Islamic style of architecture.
- Juan Brugera Rogent: An architect from Madrid who presented a purely neoclassical design, with the main façade consisting of a Corinthian colonnade and a dome 65 meters in diameter.
- Salvador Soteras i Taberner: This project suggested a palace where the ground floor could not be seen from Plaça Espanya. The structure was reduced to a minimum; however it did include a dome and two towers. The architect received an honorable mention, although almost posthumously, as he died in the spring of 1925.
- Rafael Bergamín, Luis Blanco Soler and Ricardo García Guereta: Three architects belonging to the school of Madrid, their project was one that deviated from the earlier design by Puig i Cadafalch. Classical in style, it presented a façade of columns and a pediment and was the only proposal which did not suggest a dome or towers. The project also included a rear façade which included a sculpture realized by Victorio Macho.
- Eduardo Fernández Díaz: The design was one of a neoclassical style with a central cupola.
- Eugenio Cendoya and Enric Catà: The winning project (see below for more details).
- Nicolau Maria Rubió i Tudurí, Ramon Reventós and Francesc Folguera: Their design attempted to harmonize with the palaces constructed by Puig i Cadafalch. Curiously, this project and that of Eduardo Fernandez were the only ones which did not feature in the magazine Arquitectura, which published the results of the competition and their illustrations.
- Ramon Térmens Mauri: One of the most disparate projects presented in relation to that designed by Puig i Cadafalch, it proposed the main façade be on the street of the stadium instead of facing Plaça Espanya. The Great Hall has a cruciform plan, with large vaults and a central dome.
- Jaume Santomà and Mariano Romaní: The youngest architects of all the entries. Romaní was said to have not yet completed his architectural studies at the time. Their proposal was clearly based on that of Puig i Cadafalch, but with easier construction solutions. They received second prize.

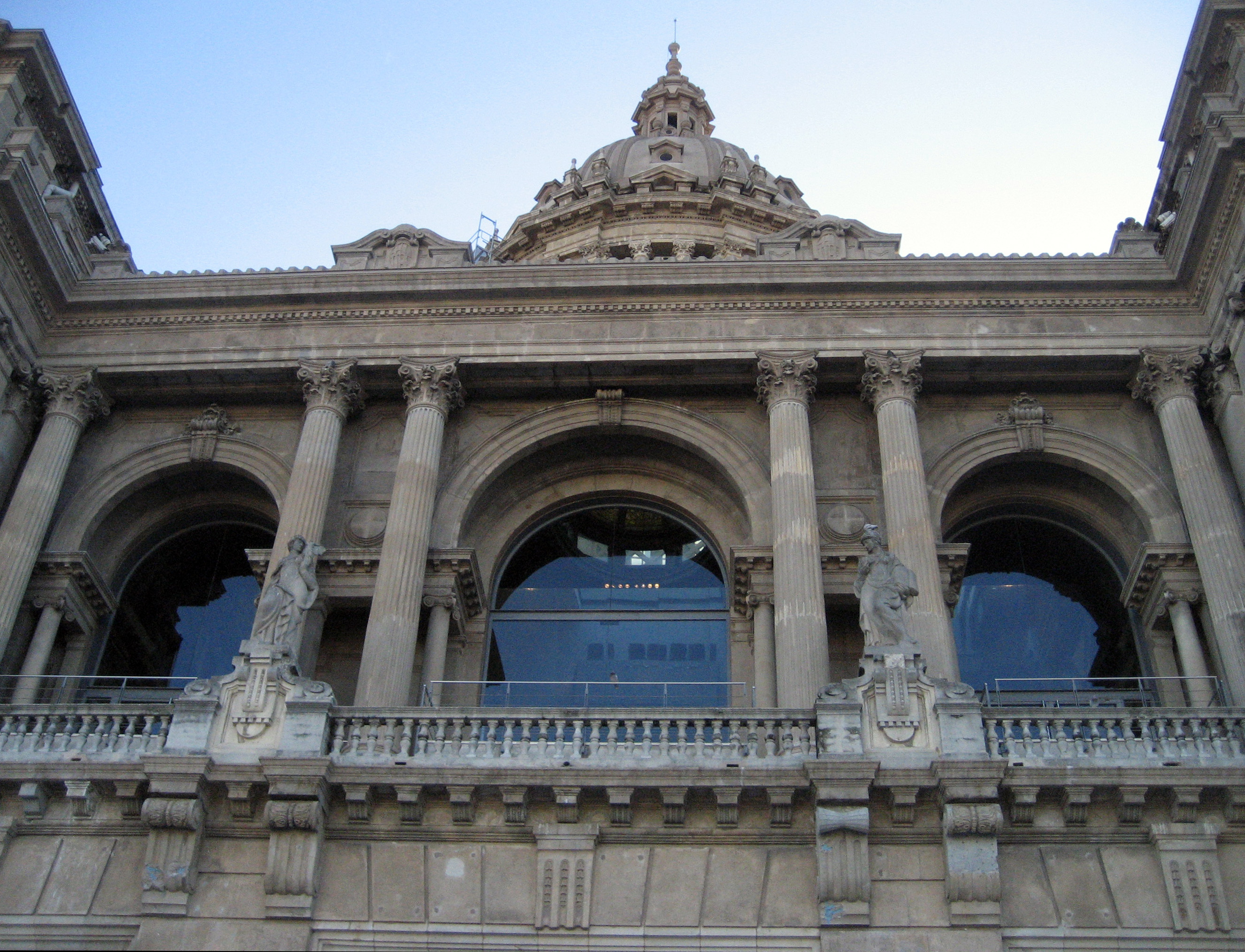
Central part of the façade of the Palau Nacional

The winning proposal was that of Eugenio Cendoya and Enric Catà, with honorable mentions given to Salvador Soteras and Santomà i Romaní. The president of the presiding jury was the then-mayor of Barcelona, Darius Rumeu i Freixa. The winning project also included the collaboration of the constructor Antoni Montseny, and in some publications, the name Pere Domènech i Roura appears, who was already the general manager of construction of the Exhibition.

=== Executive project ===
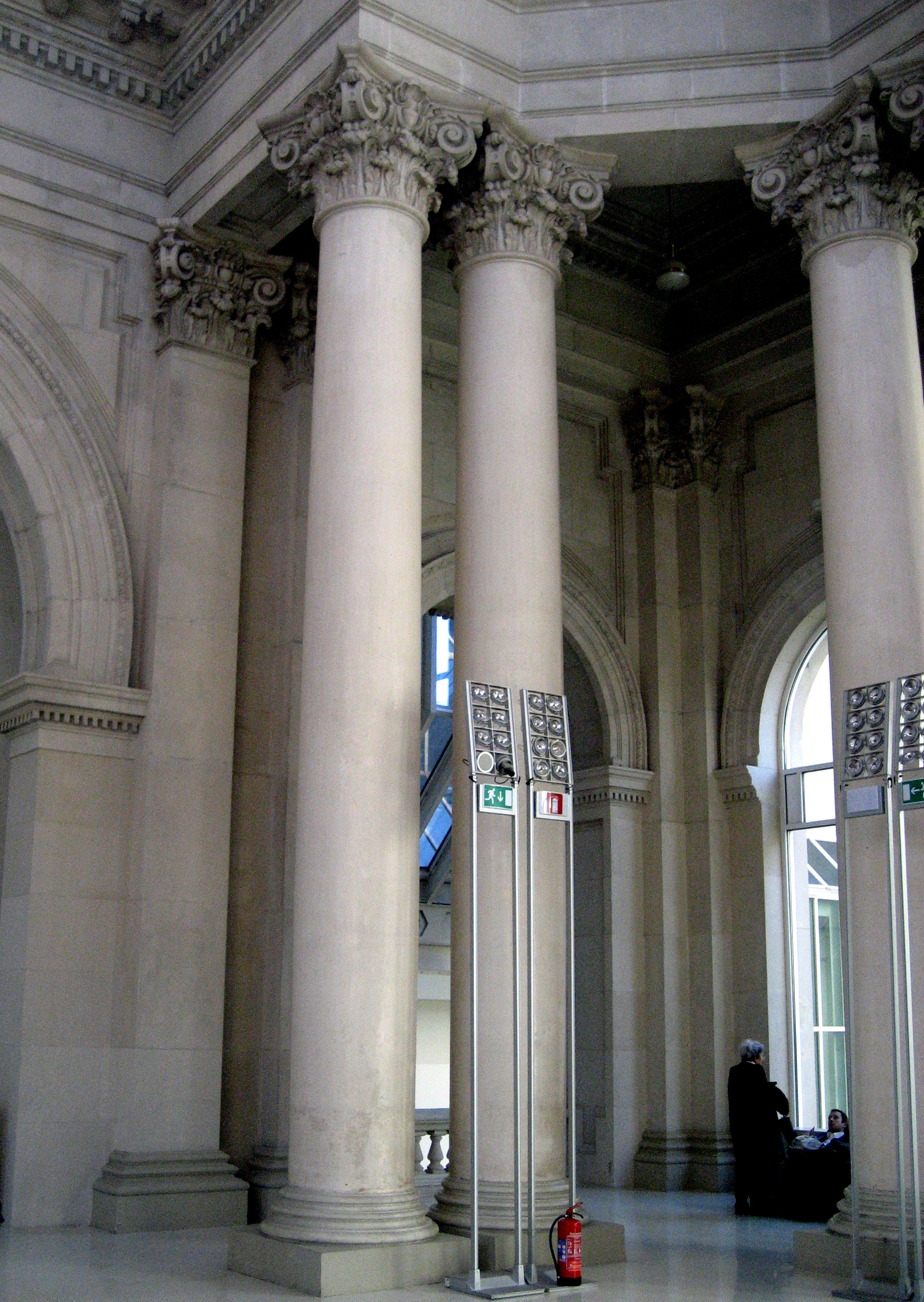
Artificial stone columns which support the Great Dome, made on site

During 1925 the competition, winners made the implementation plan of their project. One of the most important factors was the guarantee of development of the work in a given timeframe. A mechanism to bring the construction time forward was found in the rationalization of architectonic elements; searching for repetition that would serve to save time during the building process. Three materials served to be most important during the construction; concrete, artificial stone and iron. According to the architects themselves, the artificial stone, manufactured on-site, is T-shaped in order to provide a good grip on the wall structures between which they are applied. A norm was presented by which all walls and framework were to be realized in concrete and the lost formwork in artificial stone, incorporating the visible decoration. The flat roofs were constructed using a system of reinforced concrete and coffering, which formed the final decoration. As a result, the interior comprises iron housing, filled with concrete to one side, and the other treated with decorative plaster work. For the lobby, stairs and basement, the so-called 'Catalan Vault' was used, consisting of flat-laid brick work. Amongst the pieces of artificial stone made on-site are sixteen columns supporting the dome, each of one meter in diameter and ten in height, and hollow in structure. Each column is made from a singular piece of artificial stone. The structure of the Great Hall measures 46 x 74 meters with a height of 70 meters. On 30 June 1926 the first stone of the construction was placed, an occasion marked by diverse authorities including the president of the executive committee of the Exhibition, Mariano de Foronda, the mayor of Barcelona Darius Rumeu i Freixa, and the director of construction Pere Domènech i Roura.

== Architecture ==
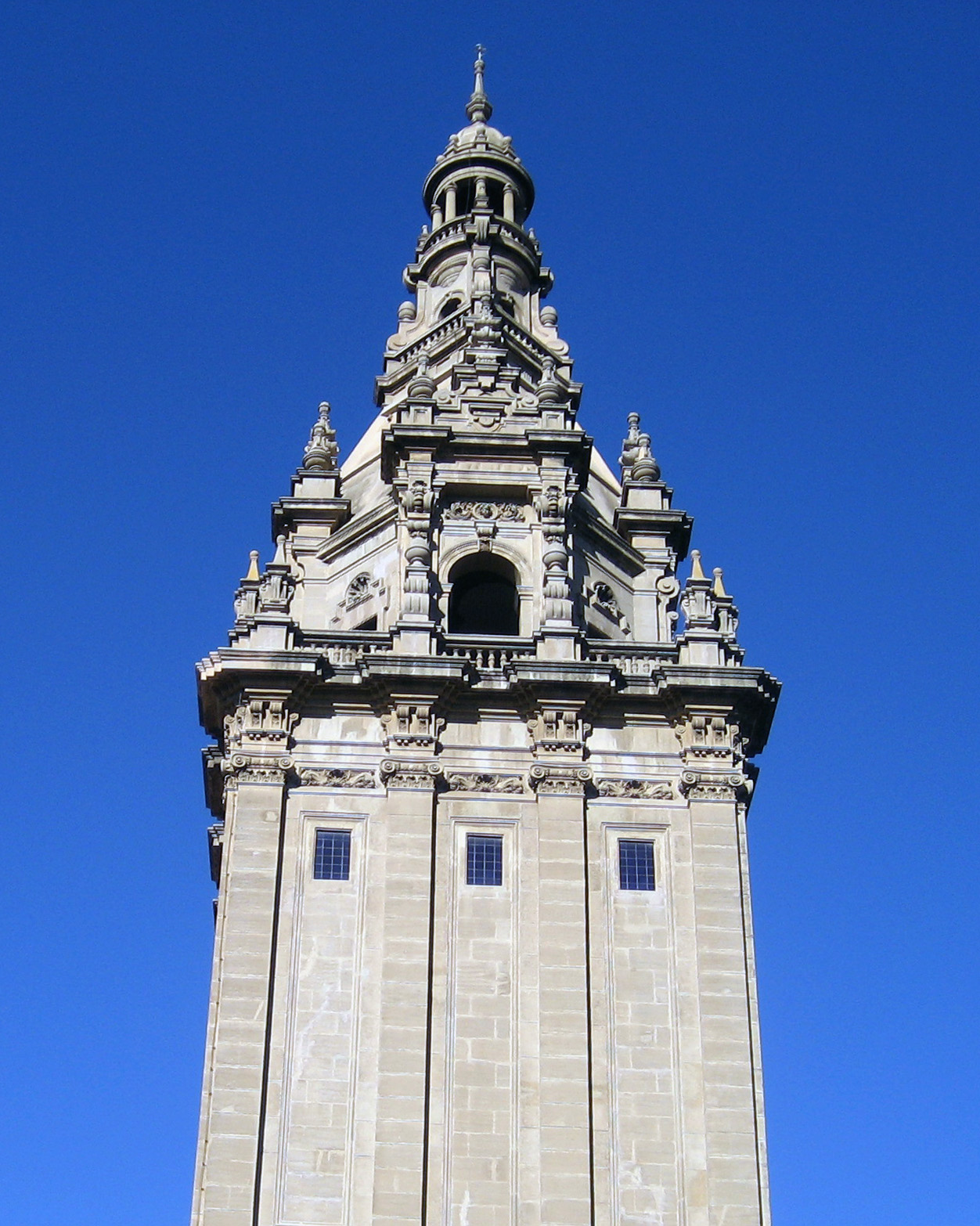
One of the four towers of the Palau Nacional

The design of the National Palace is a unified style of Spanish Renaissance architecture with an air of academic classicism.

It is the result of different functional forms and construction procedures, resolved by a technical language attributed to the Barcelona School of Architecture. The construction of the Palace consists of the combination of traditional systems based on symmetry, as clearly outlined in its composition and, that of the building procedure dominated by more modern techniques and materials such as the use of concrete.

The building has two floors: one base or ground floor and another main floor which holds double pilasters, marking the great blind wall panels. At the north-eastern part of the structure lies a subterranean space, which at the moment of construction was destined for the installation of kitchens. There was also a set of rooms constructed: the Throne Room, rooms for the King and Queen and, to the front of the building, the museum section. To the back of the building an area for events was created, with a small tea room or restaurant, located in the body of space which stands behind the Great Hall. The façade consists of a central body flanked by two smaller side ones. The center topped by a large dome reminiscent of that of St Paul's Cathedral in London or that of St. Peter's Basilica in the Vatican, with two smaller domes on each side. At the four angles corresponding to those of the Great Hall stand four towers that resemble those of the Cathedral of Santiago de Compostela or the Giralda of Seville.

== Interior decoration ==
The architectural project not only included architectural decoration such as columns, pediments and moldings but also considered such interior decoration as murals and sculptures. The ornamentation of the interior spaces depended on the organizational committee who resulted in giving the amount of 1,200,000 pesetas towards its realization. Responsible for the project management was Louis Plenduira, curator of the Fine Arts Exhibition. The work commenced in winter of 1928, leaving the artists three months to carry out their pieces. The style of the art work produced belongs to that of which prevailed in Catalonia at the time namely the noucentisme style, which is found especially in the decoration of the main dome and the domes under the Throne Room, the Great Hall and the Tea Room.

The neo-Renaissance architecture contrasts with its 20th-century decoration by sculptors Enric Casanoves, Josep Dunyach, Federic Marès and Josep Llimona, and painters Francesc d'Ássís Galí, Josep de Togores, Manuel Humbert, Josep Obiols i Palau, Joan Colom i Augustí and Francesc Labarta.

=== The Great Hall ===
Beyond the lobby is the Great Hall (Gran Saló), or Oval Room (Saló Oval). Due to its large dimensions, it was conceived as a space for the hosting of great events; from the official ceremony to the inauguration of the Exhibition, as well as concerts, balls, galas and conferences. The hall is 2,300 m^{2} and has standing room for 1,300 people. The Oval Room hosted the opening ceremony of the Exhibition, presided by Alfonso XIII and Queen Victoria Eugenie.

The Great Hall is covered by an oval shaped coffered vault, with large columns dominating the decoration. The column's shafts are adorned with a Renaissance grotesque decoration. The decoration is simple, consisting of ornamental borders and basic vegetation motifs, which line both the arches and the coves of the vault. Another design element of the Salon is the fifty-six small heraldic shields which occupy the space between the arches and represent the fifty Spanish provinces which existed in 1929. The six remaining shields depict musical instruments and are located in the part of the Salon where the organ is found.

For the Universal Exhibition of 1888 in Barcelona two electric organs were installed in the Salon of the Queen of Regent of the Palace of the Fine Arts (Palau de les Belles Arts); this initiative being faithful to the tradition undertaken in other Exhibitions such as that of Glasgow in 1901, of Saint Louis in 1904 and that of San Diego in 1915. It was thus seen appropriate to continue this tradition and so install an organ for the new Exhibition in Barcelona. The organ was built in 1929 by E.F. Walcker & Cie. from Ludwigsburg (Germany). The mechanisms entirely electric and consisted of 154 music registers divided into five keyboards and a pedal keyboard of thirty-two notes, with more than two thousand organ pipes. It was inaugurated by Professor Alfred Sittard on 6 July 1929. The organ was restored and enlarged in 1955, wherein two thousand five hundred new pipes were added to the previous amount. With the expansion of the organ it now contains six keyboards and measures a total of eleven meters in height and 34 meters in width.

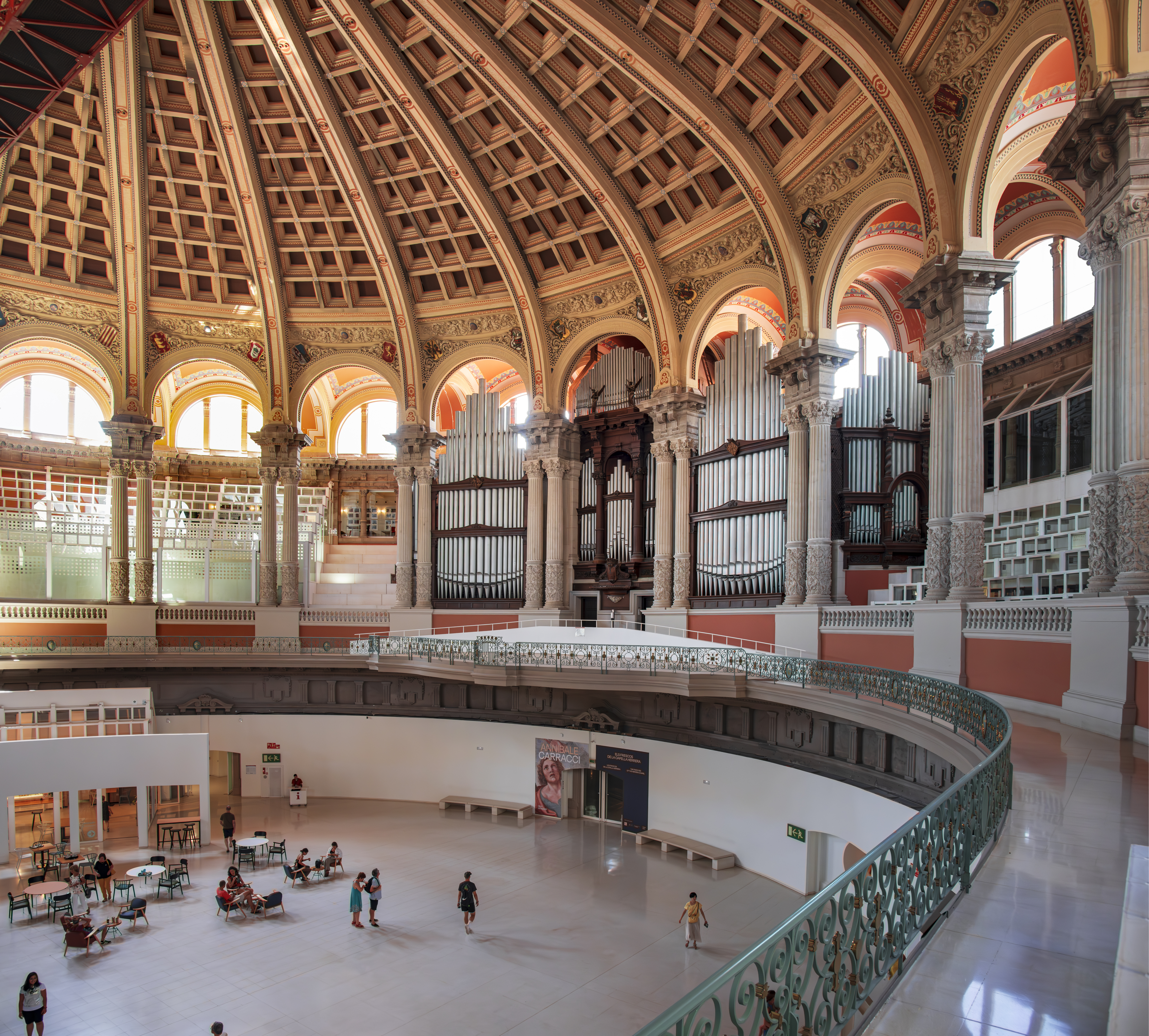
Southwest part of the Great Hall

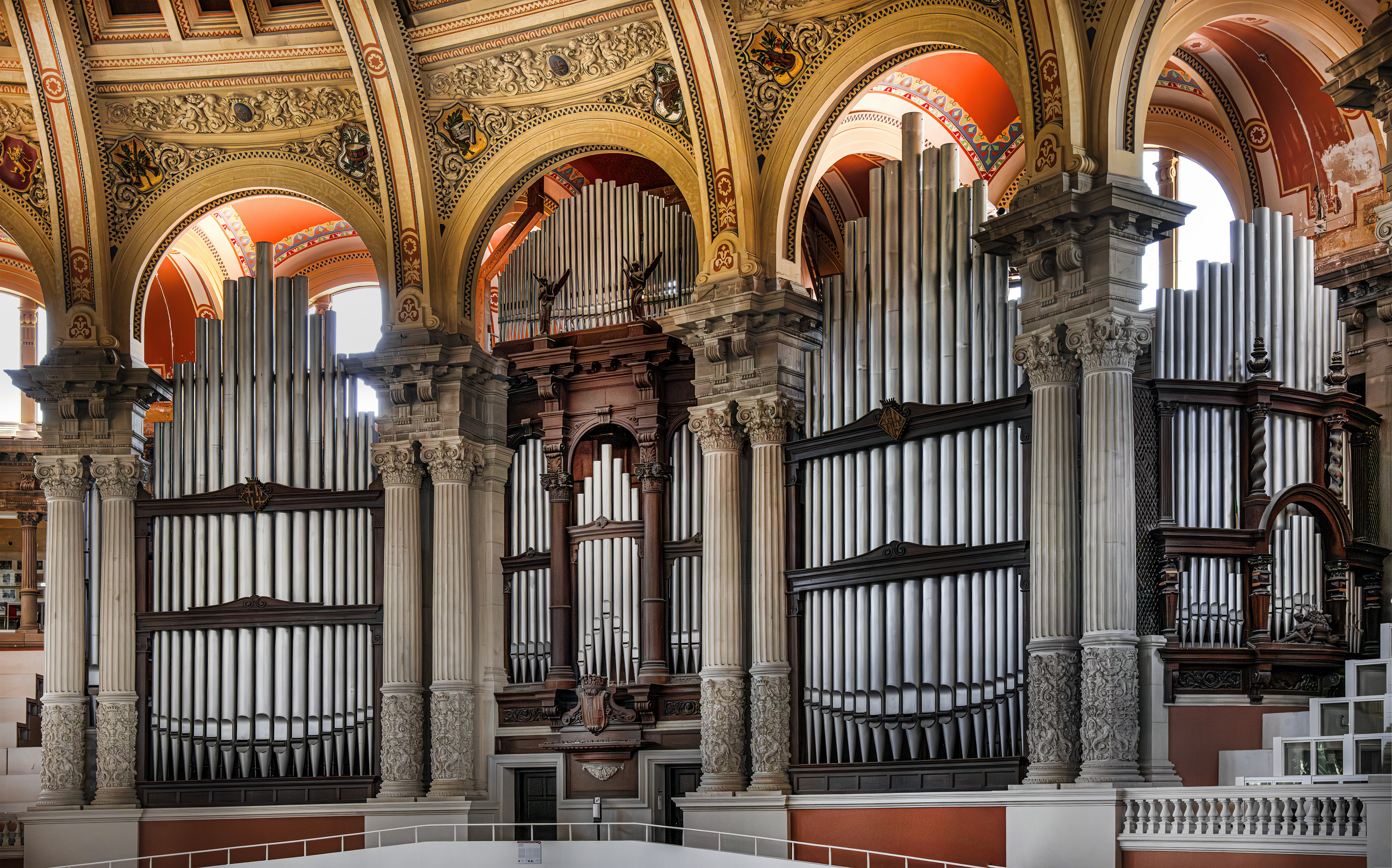
Organ of the Palau Nacional

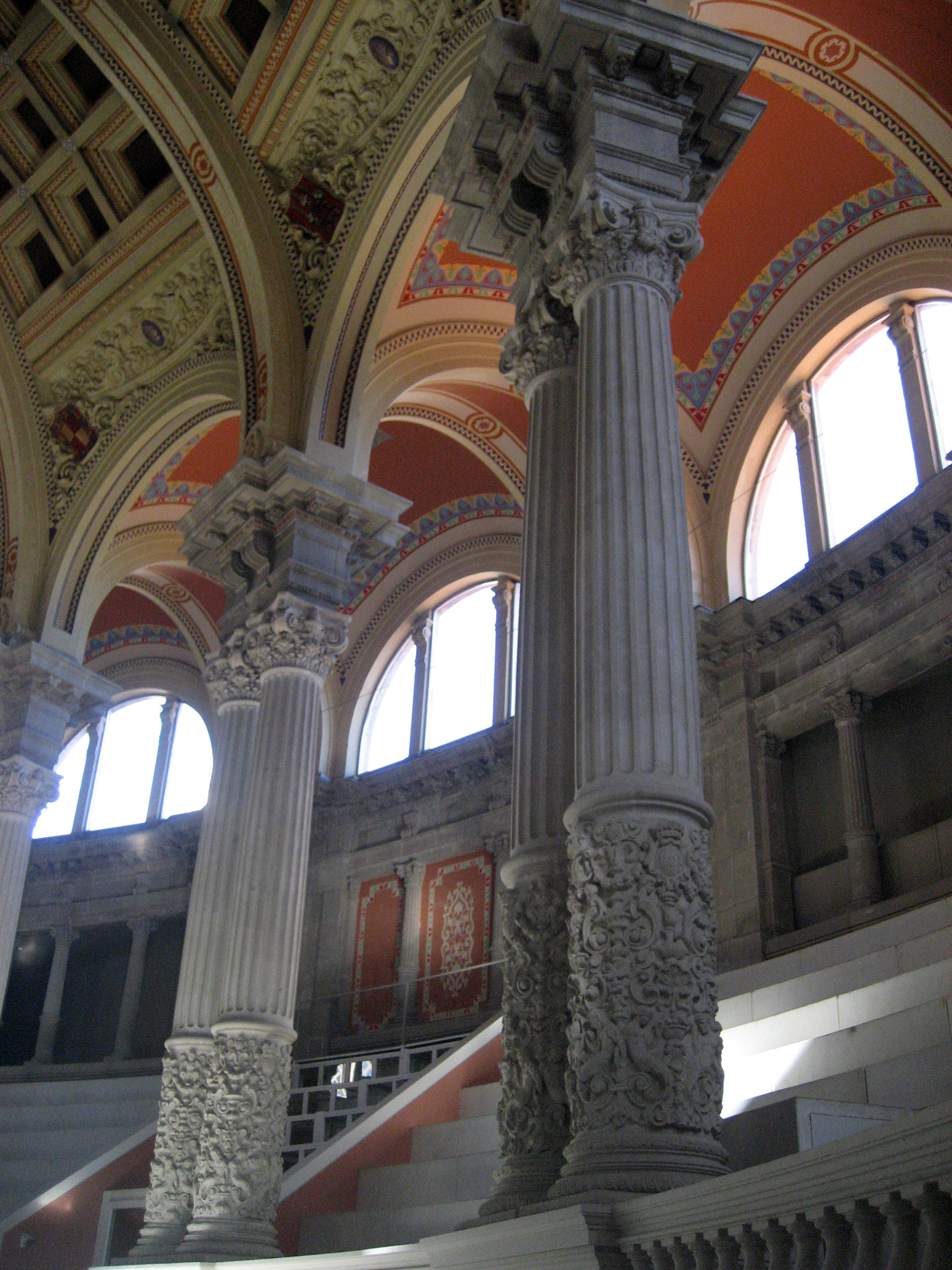
Interior design of the Great Hall

=== Throne Room ===
The Throne Room (Saló del Tron), also known as the Conference or Proceedings Room (Sala d'Actes), is that decorated with the most noble of materials. Each wall surface is treated with different coloured marbles, realized in the formation of geometric designs. Above the throne hangs a portrait of King Alfonso XIII. It is an oil painting which was commissioned for the occasion of the 1929 Exhibition and was realized by the Barcelona painter Richard Canals. The lateral walls of the room are decorated with allegorical paintings referencing the Exhibition of 1888 and realized by Francesc Labarta; others relate to the Exhibition of 1929 and were painted by Xavier Nogués. The painter Josep Obiols i Palau also contributed with a series of four frescos depicting the cardinal virtues: Fortitude, Temperance, Justice and Prudence, located in the four tympana of the arches in the Throne Room.

=== Principal dome ===
For the decoration of the dome, Lluís Plandiura suggested that is should be entrusted to one of the best Catalan artists of the time. For this reason the central part of the dome (a surface area of about 300 m^{2}) was realized by Francesc d'Assís Galí, who was contracted to represent 'in a tremendous way, the grandeur of Spain, justified in a symbolic composition defined by four fields: Religion, Science, Fine Arts and Land'.

- Religion: The scene of Christ crucified, at his sides are the figures of a martyr and an angel, at his feet, an infidel. Another scene depicts a Saracen leader handing over the keys of a city to the Christian army.
- Science: A female allegory of geometry and triumphs of science, accompanied by Miguel Servet and his investigation of the circulatory system; Blasco de Garay, the inventor of navigation with use of the paddle wheel; and an Arab from Córdoba observing the stars.
- The Fine Arts: A woman with a rainbow and a laurel branch. Two female figures symbolising Architecture hold a building model. There are also representations of Painting, Sculpture, Literature and Music.
- The Earth: A female figure holding the moon with one hand and the sun lying at her feet. There are also several painted fruits of the earth relating to agriculture, industry and livestock.
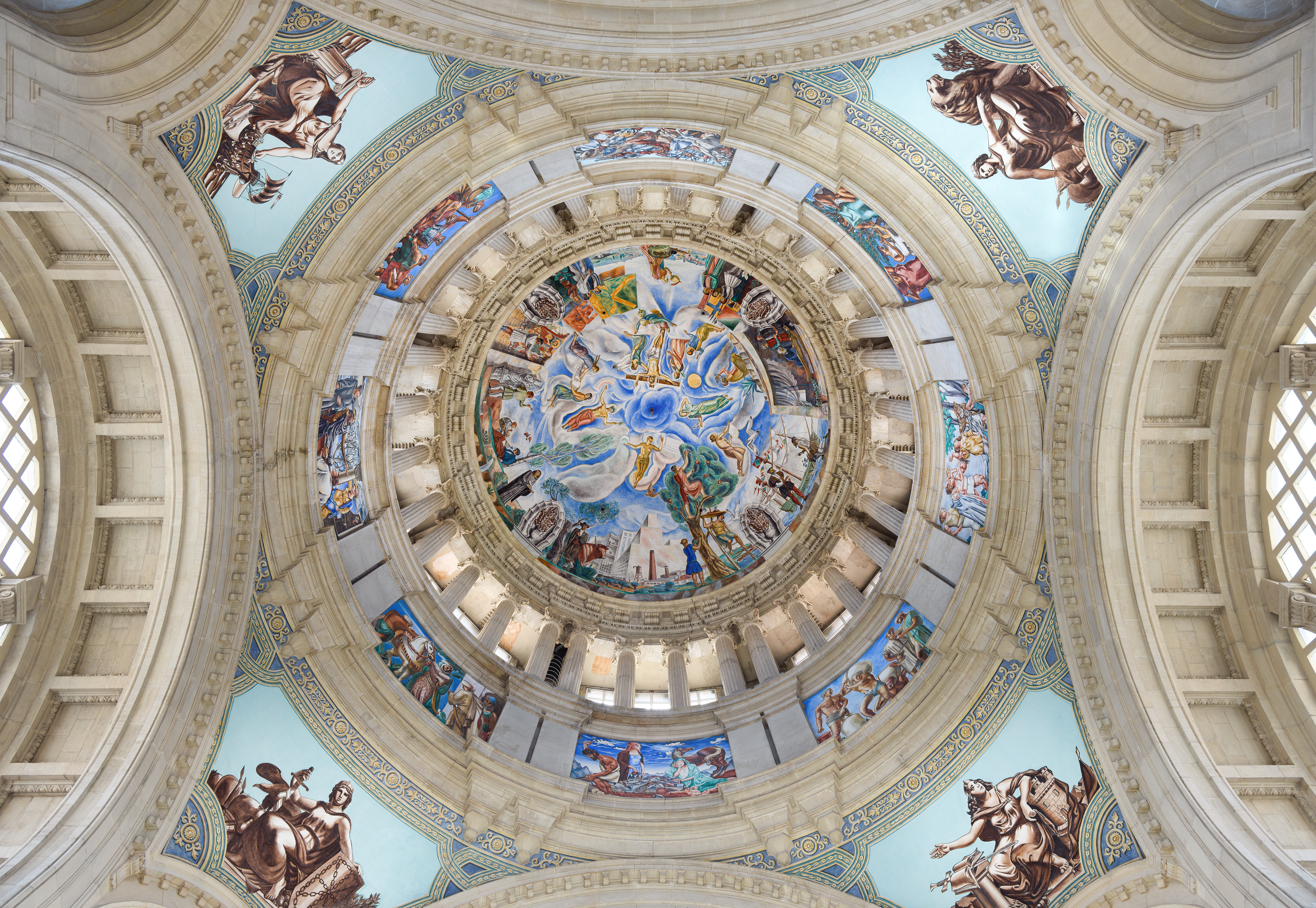
Principal Dome of the Palau Nacional

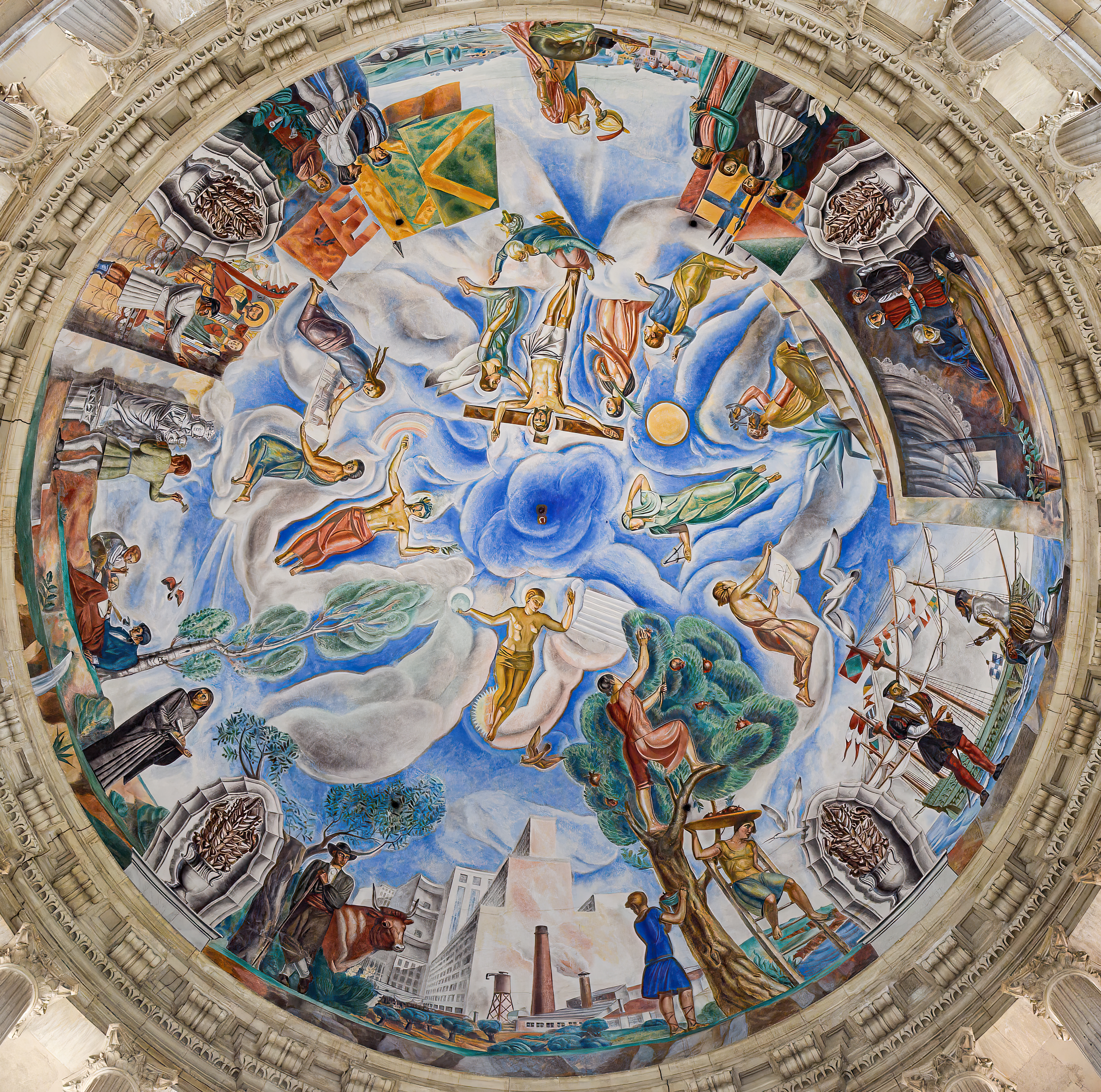
Fresco work by Francesc d'Assís Galí

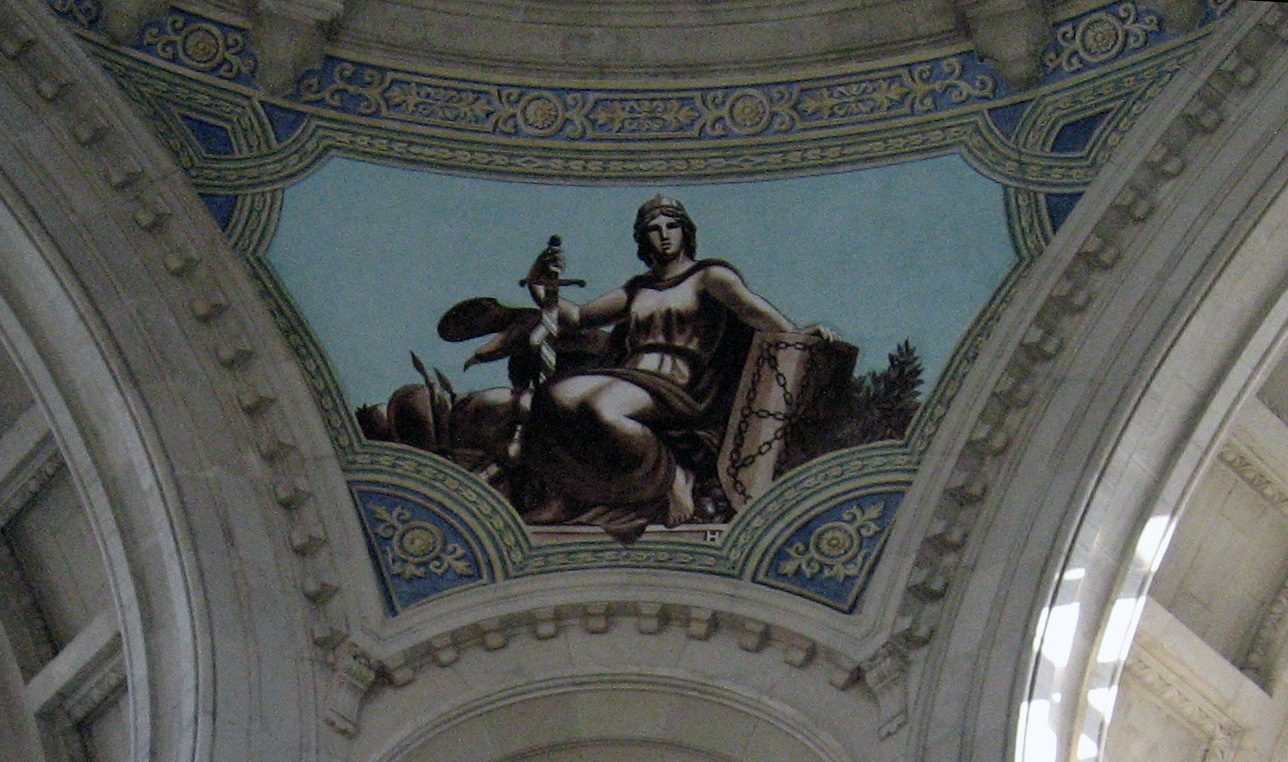
Kingdom of Navarre by Manuel Humbert

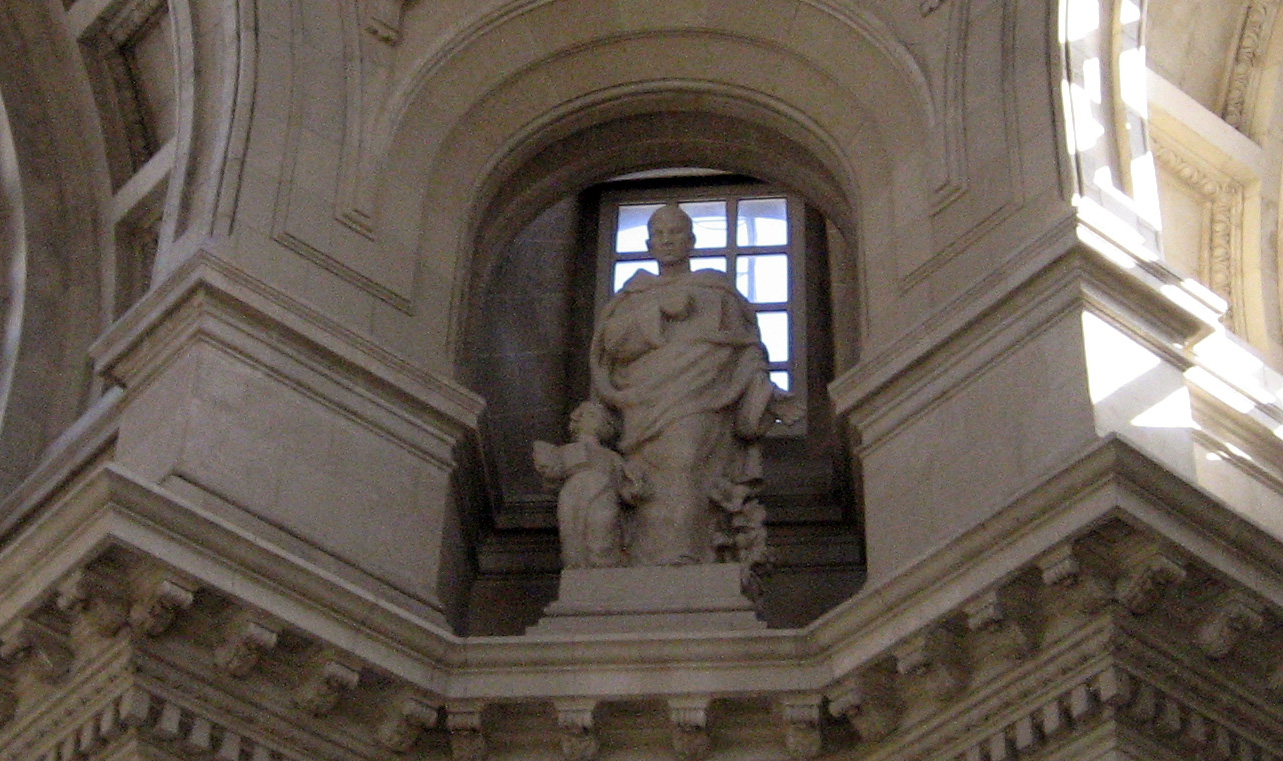
Religion by Enric Casanovas

The drum of the dome consists of eight panels representing ancient civilization paintings, realized by Josep Togores and Manual Humbert. The shells were painted by the aforementioned artists in the grisaille technique and depict four allegories relating to the former kingdoms of León, Castille, Navarre and the Crown of Aragon. Under the shells, four sculptures are located in niches representing to one side, Law and Force by sculptor Josep Dunyach; and to the other side, Work and Religion, by sculptor Enric Casanovas.

== Art in Spain ==
The 1929 International Exhibition was organised around three thematic areas: Industry, Sport and Art, the last of which led to a grand exhibition in the National Palace titled el arte en España ('Art in Spain').

A 'Regulation and Guarantee of the dedicated section of Art in Spain at the National Palace' was developed, whereby the purpose of the collection was outlined:

It will be a demonstration, organised and suggestive of various historical, artistic and archaeological jewels which will serve to outline Spain's past in a manner never achieved by any other country before. Specialists will be able to observe authentic and invaluable objects. The erudite will be able to contemplate numerous canvases, which form the core of the Exhibition and outline the evolution of the Spanish people and their sumptuous arts. The masses of visitors will find characteristic scenes of national history, presented in an attractive manner, achieving an unforgettable record of their spirit.

The organisers chose highlights of the history of art, particularly for their value and significance, soliciting the works from their owners as well as accepting proposals. They gathered in total some 5,000 works of diverse nature from museums, individuals, religious institutions, libraries and archives from different parts of Spain. In total the works are said to have had a value of some 800 million pesetas.

The collection was organised in chronological order, from the epoch of Roman Spain to the period of Isabella II. Months later, a pre-historic section was added to the exhibition, which was located in the basement of the Palace. Amongst the pieces created exclusively for the collection were a number of commissioned dioramas which highlight the history of Spain, realised by the same artists that had participated in the decoration of the Palace. There were fifteen final themes in total, part of the twenty-seven initially planned for the exhibition:

- Recceswinth
- Al-Mansur
- The Exile of El Cid
- Romanesque Painting
- James I Cries at the Bodies of the Montcada Brothers
- Alfonso X the Wise
- Peter the Cruel
- The Entrance of Alfonso V to Naples
- The Arrival of Columbus to Barcelona
- Friar Luis de León
- Charles V at Yuste
- Philip II and the Duchess of Alba
- Quevedo on the Steps of San Felipe
- Charles III
- Inauguration of the first Barcelona-Mataró railway

== Restoration ==
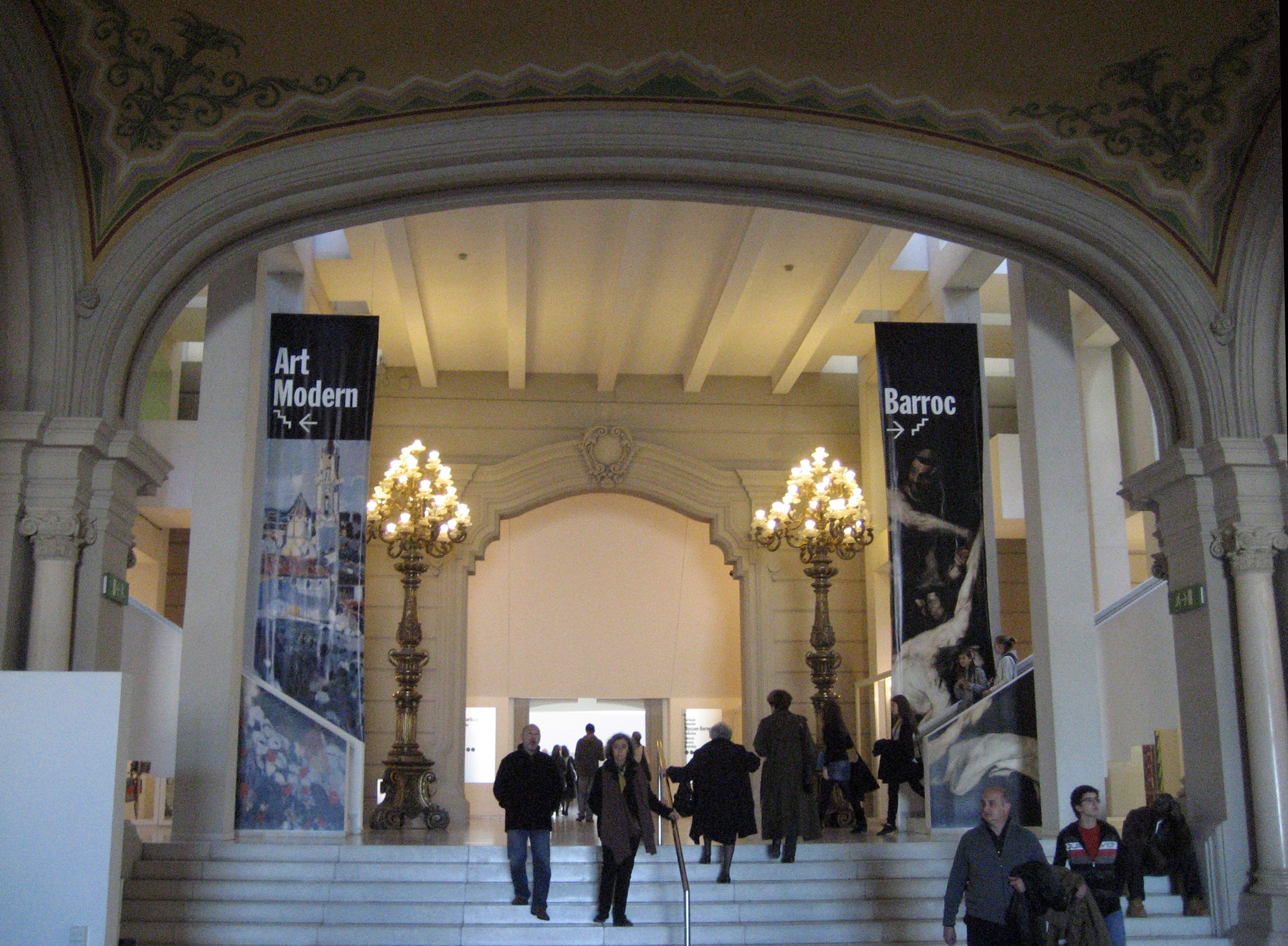
Lobby of the Palau

Architects Eugenio Cendoya, Enric Catà and Pere Domènech i Roura constructed Palau Nacional as a temporary building for the Exhibition of 1929. The speed of the construction and the modesty of the materials used meant that a restoration of the structure was called for in 1934, when it became the National Art Museum of Catalonia. It was the ground floor rooms which underwent the most important transformation. The architect Ramon Reventós was appointed in charge of the renovation, in which they removed excess interior decorations and smoothed the wall surfaces to prepare for the display of paintings. They also undertook the creation of an exterior water collection network to prevent moisture leaks and repaired the cracks which had become visible on some of the wall surfaces.

The Palau Nacional has undergone many different interventions. A few years later the first-floor rooms were rendered unusable after damage to the roof during the Spanish Civil War. This damage was repaired during the restoration undertaken in the 1960s to prepare for the exhibition on Romanesque art, a project directed by the head of Museums of Art of Barcelona, Joan Ainaud de Lasarte.

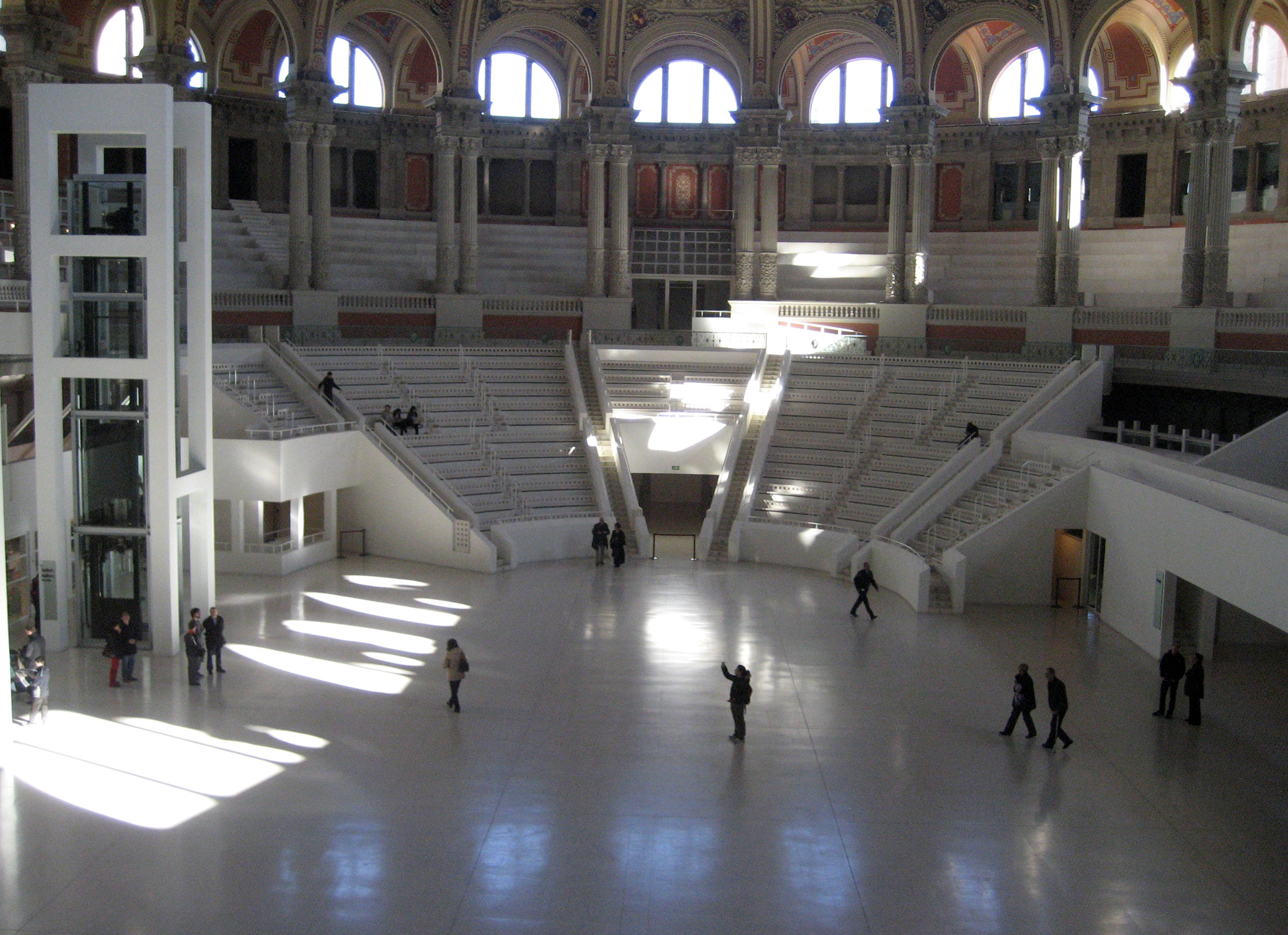
Great Hall renovated, with stands and elevators

From the 1960s until the 1980s the Italian architect Gae Aulenti was contracted to rectify the problems that surfaced during the exhibition. As a large number of artworks has accumulated, it became critical to make use of the spacious interiors and high ceilings as exhibition spaces. In 1990, at the hands of Enric Steegman, renovation began. It took longer than expected, however, due to technical complications. As a result, the works were carried out in phases, and the museum collections were opened gradually. For the 1992 Olympic Games in Barcelona, they could only reveal part of the museum besides the Great Hall, where the inauguration of the Games was held.

In 2000 the final phase of the renovation began, which included the collaboration of architect Josep Benedito. In 2003 the newly complete temporary exhibitions space was inaugurated and finally in 2004 the work on the museum came to a close. Now with a total surface area of 51,600 m^{2}, this added a total of 15,300 meters squared to the original surface area of the building. The water fountain located to the front of the Palau Nacional also underwent a restoration process. The official opening ceremony, attended by King Juan Carlos I and Queen Sofia, took place on 16 December 2004.

In 2009 work was again started on the Palau, this time under the direction of architects Enric Steegman and Joan Ardèvol, with the objective of restoring the exterior projections of the building, as well as the surrounding gardens, as explained by the administrator of the National Art Museum:

This is a definitive structural intervention, consisting of replacing the damaged structural elements and securing the cornices of the building by way of titanium bars hidden in the structure.

== Bibliography ==
- DDAA (1930). Aclaraciones respecto al caso de los arquitectos de la Exposición de Barcelona. Barcelona.
- Barral i Altet, Xavier (1992). El Palau Nacional: Crònica gràfica. Barcelona: Museu Nacional d'Art de Catalunya y Lunwerg Editores. ISBN 84-8043-001-X.
- Grandas, M. Carmen (1988). L'Exposició Internacional de Barcelona de 1929. Sant Cugat del Vallès: Els llibres de la frontera. ISBN 84-85709-68-3.
- Roig, Josep (1995). Historia de Barcelona. Barcelona: Ed. Primera Plana S.A. ISBN 84-8130-039-X.
