= Renate Drucker =

German historian and archivist

Renate Drucker

Renate Drucker (11 July 1917 – 23 October 2009) was a German archivist. She was in charge of the university archives at Leipzig University for 27 years between 1950 and 1977.

She was qualified as a philologist and was also for many years an officer of the Liberal Democratic Party of (East) Germany ("Liberal-Demokratische Partei Deutschlands" / LDPD), one of several "bloc parties" controlled by the ruling East German Socialist Unity Party ("Sozialistische Einheitspartei Deutschlands" / SED) which were intended to broaden the régime's constitutional legitimacy.

== Life ==
=== Provenance and early years ===
Renate Margarethe Drucker was born in Leipzig during the First World War, the youngest daughter of the lawyer Martin Drucker and his wife Margarethe (born Margarethe Mannsfeld). Both her grandfathers had also been Leipzig lawyers. Her mother's younger brother, Karl Mannsfeld, also had a legal background and at one stage served as the Justice Minister for the "Free State of Saxony". She attended the Servières School for girls (Servièresche höhere Mädchenschule) school in central Leipzig and then the Schloss Salem boarding school near the shores of Lake Constance. Salem was a prestigious establishment, but Drucker herself would frequently express her sadness that, as a girl, she had been unable to follow her brothers in attending the Thomas School in Leipzig, with its rich musical heritage. (The school has subsequently become co-educational.)

In October 1936 she moved on to Leipzig University initially intending to study Jurisprudence which would have enabled her to follow her father and uncle into the legal profession. It was already apparent that the increasingly institutionalised antisemitism of Nazi Germany would make a legal career impossible, however. Instead she quickly became fascinated by languages, attending lectures in German studies, Oriental studies, English studies and a little History. By early 1938 she was evidently destined for a degree focused on Philology. At this point, however, in April her studies were suddenly interrupted by the Nazi Race Delusions. As Nazi ideas on race became embedded in daily life, Germans were encouraged to engage in a little basic genealogy and research their four grandparents in order to demonstrate to the authorities that none of these had been Jewish. The official verdict on Drucker was not that she was Jewish, but that she was a "Mongrel, 2nd grade " ("Mischling II. Grades" / 25% Jewish). She was rewarded with a permanent ("unbefrist") study ban at the university. The absence of a simple "Aryan certificate" now became a continuing burden for Drucker and her family for the rest of the twelve Nazi years, making it very difficult for her to complete her education. The outbreak of war in 1939 would in various respects intensify the difficulties.

The enforced termination of her studies in 1938 was followed by three years of uncertainty and unemployment. She was then, in 1941, unexpectedly readmitted to Leipzig University, where without being exactly welcomed she was nevertheless, grudgingly, permitted to attend lectures. She again adjusted the focus of her work, concentrating now on Historical sciences, Medieval Latin and Auxiliary history sciences ("historische Hilfswissenschaften"). Progressing all the way to a higher degree at Leipzig was still unthinkable, so she then enrolled at Germany's Strasbourg University "Reichsuniversität Straßburg" where she worked on her doctorate, supported by the historian Hermann Heimpel (1901–1988) and Walter Stach (1890–1955). Just hours before US and French troops entered the city, on 23 November 1944, she successfully defended her dissertation and thereby justified her doctorate for work on "the Old High German Glosses in the Salic law" ("Die althochdeutschen Glossen in der Lex salica"). She had chosen, a little unusually, to have the entire "vive voce" conducted in Medieval Latin, and the resulting qualification came with a cum laude distinction. By the time the doctorate was awarded, in February 1945, Drucker, along with those of the university teaching staff still not conscripted into the army, had been successfully evacuated to Tübingen which is where the doctorate was actually issued.

=== Academic and archivist ===
War ended, formally, in May 1945, and with it the Nazi régime. Drucker had successfully, and not without the odd adventure along the way, made her way back to the bombed-out city of Leipzig. In terms of the future, the US and Soviet governments had already agreed that Germany would be divided into zones of occupation: Leipzig would be administered as part of the Soviet occupation zone. When the war ended, however, it was the US army that had captured the city, while the Red army concentrated on military objectives further to the north including, notably, Berlin. In the early summer of 1945 the Drucker family found themselves in danger in what remained of Leipzig. Before the Nazi power seizure Martin Drucker had worked as a public prosecutor and had also gained a reputation as a criminal defence lawyer. There were still plenty of Nazis in the city who detested him, and the family accordingly moved to Jena and went into hiding for several weeks. It was only in June 1945, as order began to be restored, that the family were able to move back into Leipzig. In July 1945 US forces withdrew from Leipzig which now, for the next 45 years, would fall within the ambit of the Soviet Union.

Renate Drucker's contribution to the democratic renewal of Germany now included work for the Leipzig Professional Committee of Lawyers and Notaries, engaged in the denazification of the profession. The university reopened in 1946 which opened the way for a return to academe. She volunteered to help with "history studies support" ("historische Hilfswissenschaften") at the University's Historical Institute under Professor Helmut Kretzschmar (1893–1965), and just over a year later was given a job teaching Medieval Latin, at which she excelled.

In 1950 she was appointed to take over as head of the University Archive. The appointment, which came after several months of unclarity, temporary arrangements and fevered discussions, was made at the suggestion of a history professor newly returned from several years at the University of Rostock, Heinrich Sproemberg. It was based more on political than on academic criteria and followed a change of heart by Hans-Georg Gadamer who had previously favoured a renewal of the contract of the existing university archivist, Richard Walter Franke. However, Franke had been doing the job on an honorary (unpaid) basis since 1947, and as the new regime in East Germany established its own priorities and authority, his previous membership of the Nazi Party before 1945 made it politically impossible for him to be appointed to the post on a more formal basis. On her appointment in 1950, Renate Drucker was one of the first women to be appointed to such a leadership role in any Germany university.

The appearance of a young woman - das "Archivfräulein" - in charge of the university archives was difficult for some of the older professors to accept. Her academic background was far from conventional. There were even some who doubted the need for a central university archive, favouring instead the safe keeping of archived documents in the private homes of the distinguished academic experts who best understood their significance. The main archive building, sandwiched between the Augusteum building and the Pauliner church was seen by some not as the University Archive but simply as an archive for the Rector's Office, which was reflected in its size. During the early 1950s an important task for Drucker involved pleading for, commandeering and improvising additional storage locations.

Drucker won round the doubters and increasingly earned the respect of colleagues and students thanks to her deep scholarship, energy and a certain flair. There was much to be done. Before the outbreak of the war the most valuable items in the archive had been hurriedly placed in the relatively bomb-proof cellar of the adjacent Augusteum building, while other records had been distributed away from the vulnerable city centre. The archive building itself had survived the heavy bomb attack on Leipzig of 3/4 December 1943, but it was only in 1949 that a start had been made on retrieving and sorting the material from the next door cellar where it had been placed ten years earlier. She rapidly collected together items of historical interest that had been scattered by the predations of Nazism and war. A high point, backed by the easing of political tensions within the Soviet bloc that accompanied Nikita Khrushchev's time as first party secretary, was the repatriation in 1958 of large amounts of material from the Soviet Union that had been removed either for safe keeping or else as booty in 1945. Reflecting her own academic background, the rich collection of medieval documents became a greatly treasured university resource for the academic community. Across the universities sector in East Germany she created a "Working Group for the archive departments of academic institutions" ("Arbeitsgemeinschaft der Archivare wissenschaftlicher Einrichtungen"), designed to facilitate the orderly exchange of materials. In the context of her work as university archivist she also found time to publish a piece of research of her own concerning the history of the Leipzig university buildings.

In parallel with her responsibilities for the university archive, Drucker increasingly supported the university's work with advice and through her own teaching activities. Between 1950 and 1960 she held a formal teaching contract covering Medieval Latin and Auxiliary history sciences. Particular specialities included Palaeography, Diplomatics and Historical Chronology. She received a more formal teaching contract from the university in 1968, and became associate professor for auxiliary history sciences in 1970, a post in the University History Department which she retained till September 1977, when, formally, she retired. She nevertheless continued teaching till well into the 1990s.

=== Outside and beyond the academic milieu ===
Outside the academic world, on 5 July 1945 Drucker joined the newly created Liberal Democratic Party ("Liberal-Demokratische Partei Deutschlands" / LDPD), a new political party of which her father was a co-founder. By the time the Soviet occupation zone gave way to the Soviet sponsored German Democratic Republic in October 1949 the LDPD had become the largest of several "bloc parties" controlled by the ruling East German Socialist Unity Party ("Sozialistische Einheitspartei Deutschlands" / SED), but in 1945 the assumption was widespread that the era of one-party dictatorship in Germany was over. Drucker remained a party member for many years and was, between 1957 and 1989, listed as a member of the LDPD national executive and regional executive.

Between 1972 and 1989 she was a member of the Presidential Council of the East German Culture League. Between 1992 and 2003 she served on the board of the Leipzig-based Ephraim Carlebach Foundation of which she had been a co-founder. The foundation, named after the German rabbi Ephraim Carlebach, is dedicated to researching the many faceted contribution of the Jewish community as an integrated element in the city's history.

== Personal ==
Renate Drucker brought up her daughter, Constanze, as a single mother, which was unusual in the context of the time and place. One relatively eulogistic source refers to certain male colleagues who addressed her with an ill-concealed smirk as "Miss Drucker" at this time. In later years she was also able - apparently slightly to her own surprise - to become a devoted grandmother.

== Awards and honours ==
- 1959 Ernst Moritz Arndt Medal
- 1960 Wilhelm Külz Badge of honour
- 1960 German Democratic Republic Merit Medal
- 1962 Patriotic Order of Merit (Bronze)
- 1964 DFD Badge of Honour (Gold)
- 1964 National Front Badge of honour (Gold)
- 1967 Clara Zetkin Medal
- 1970 Society for German–Soviet Friendship Badge of honour (Gold)
- 1977 Patriotic Order of Merit (Silver)
- 1977 Badge of honour: Alma mater Lipsiensis
- 1996 Order of Merit of the Free State of Saxony
