= Enric Catà i Catà =

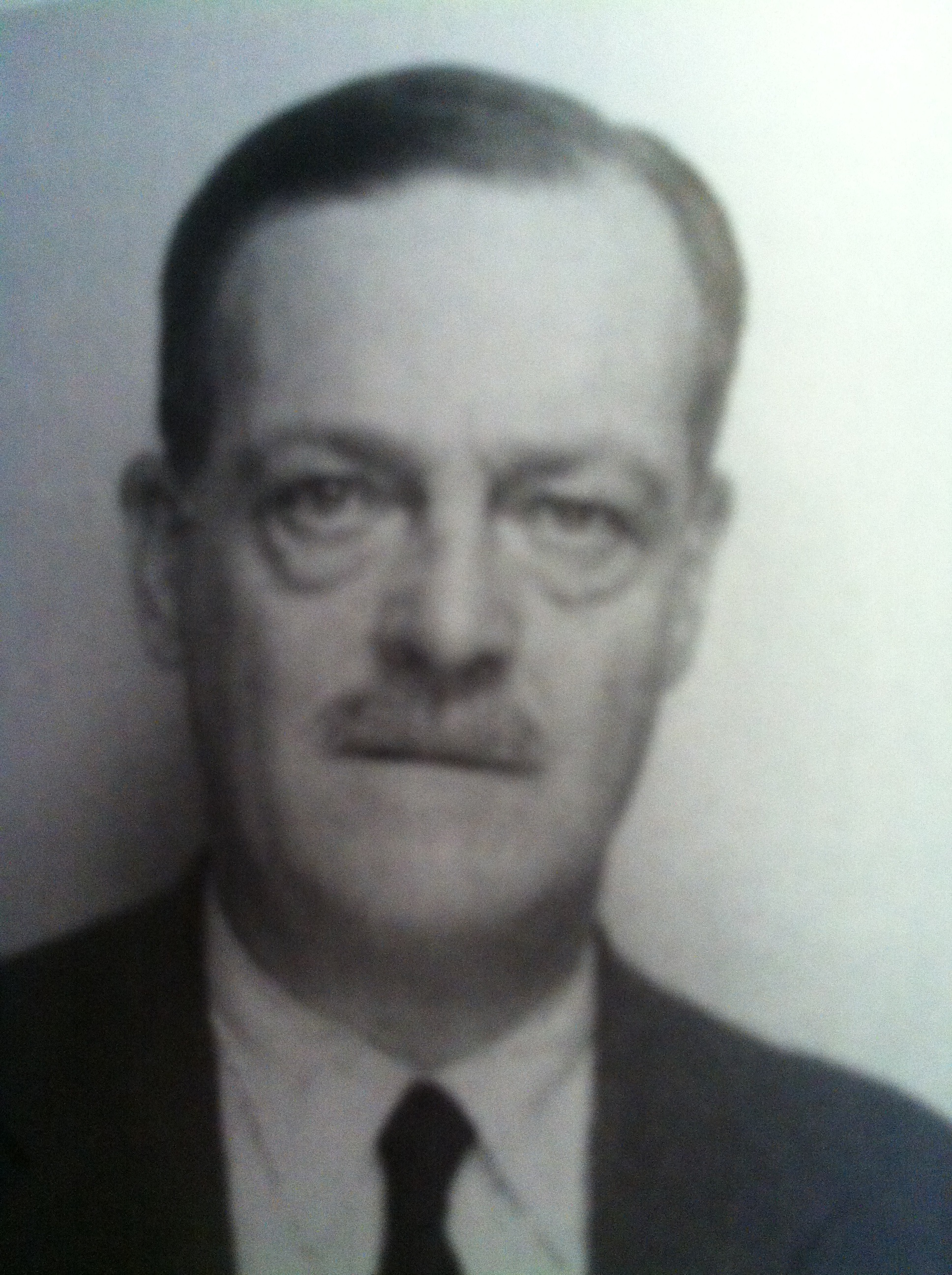
Enric Catà

Enric Catà i Catà (1878–1937) was a modernista architect from Barcelona (Catalonia).

== Early years and education ==
Enric was born in Sant Feliu de Llobregat. He was the son of Salvador Catà Rossell from Arenys de Munt and Francisca Catà Faura of Sant Feliu de Llobregat. Enric Catà did his first studies in the Escolapis of Terrassa. During 1894–1895 he attained his secondary education in Barcelona and in 1895 began the higher education in architecture, graduating in 1903 with a final project of a school of arts and jobs.

== Career ==
Enric Catà's professional career started with a dedication to both teaching and professional practice. At the Higher School of Architecture of Barcelona he spent more than twenty-five years, first as an auxiliary teacher and next as a professor. For twenty years he was municipal architect of Arenys de Munt. His designs for private clients were also built in several municipalities in the demarcations of Girona and Barcelona.

In October 1917 he was appointed municipal architect of Arenys de Munt, a position retained until his death in 1937. Commissioned by the city council will project the graduated school, with a first project in 1917 that remained unrealised and, another of 1931–33 that was inaugurated in 1937.

Other municipal works were: the bridge over the riera in 1921, the General Plan of Urbanisation in 1932, the Market and the houses for the teachers in 1936. He already had taken part in 1907 in the restoration and extension of the house Can Pau Bernadó, in the project of the chapel of the Holy Sacrament of the parish church, the year 1913, and in a project of public laundry designed around 1915. As municipal architect he also drafted numerous private projects.

Catà collaborated often with other architects. After finishing his studies, he worked in the workshop of the modernist architect Lluís Domènech i Montaner. In 1916 with Eusebi Bona i Puig he won the competition to build the Posts and Telegraphs building in Girona. Another success was in collaboration with Pedro Cendoya the winning of the design competition for the Palau Nacional in 1925, completed for the 1929 Barcelona International Exposition. Collaborating with the architect Adolf Florensa, Catà built the Cultural centre of the Doctor in Barcelona between 1929 and 1933.

In Girona projects works known as the distilleries Regàs (1907) and the distilleries Gerunda (1911) of the Greater Bridge and the Theatre Albéniz (1922). In Portbou, the renovation of the Casino España (1923). In Palamós, the School Group (1925). In Reus, the Farm Soldevila (1929). And in Barcelona, diverse bourgeois mansions unfortunately missing.

Enric Catà died in Barcelona in January 1937, killed by a motorist when crossing Passeig de Gràcia.
