= Richard Walter Franke =

Richard Walter Franke (1905–1973) was the first full-time archivist at Leipzig University.

== Life ==
Franke attended secondary school in Borna, near Leipzig, and then moved on to university successively at Heidelberg University, the Ludwig-Maximilians-Universität München and, closer to home, Leipzig University. He received his doctorate from Leipzig University in 1929 for a piece of work on censorship and press regulation in Leipzig between 1830 and 1848. After receiving his doctorate, Franke spent four years working as a school teacher.

The decision was taken to set up a central archive at Leipzig University in 1934. This would supplement and then replace various faculty and other ad hoc document collections and archives scattered round the university. On the national level, since 1933 Germany had operated under a far more interventionist and centralising style of government than was, at that time, considered normal: in a report of 31 October 1934 the retiring university rector, the distinguished agronomist Arthur Golf (1877-1941), made it clear that the project was only possible because of support received for it from the "hands-on" Ministry for National Education. The archive was to be centred on the existing rectorate archive. By the time Arthur Golf submitted his report Richard Walter Franke had been appointed as Leipzig's first University Archivist, on 1 October 1934.

As early as 1937, anticipating the risk of war and aerial bombing, Franke began to make precautionary arrangements. He arranged for the most valuable contents of the archive to be moved to the cellars of the university's Augusteum building, which were believed (correctly as matters turned out) to be bomb-proof. In June 1939, a couple of months before the actual outbreak of war, Franke switched to working for the National Student Organisation ("Reichsstudentenwerk") which had replaced the equivalent individual university based support operations in the context of the government's centralisation strategy. Directly after war ended, in May 1945, he resigned from this post, thereby avoiding the dismissal which, as a former member of the Nazi party he would inevitably have faced either under US military occupation or else, after US troops withdrew in July 1945, when Leipzig became part of the Soviet occupation zone.

After the war several professors voted for Franke's reinstatement as university archivist, even though, as a former Nazi Party member, he could not, for political reasons, become a university employee. He had, indeed, obtained a job as a waiter in Wurzen, a short distance to the east of the city. Faced with the challenges of trying to rebuild Leipzig University, in February 1947 the rector Hans-Georg Gadamer (1900-2002), placed Franke in charge of the university archive, albeit on an honorary (i.e., unpaid) basis. One prominent advocate for Franke's reinstatement was the Leipzig regional historian Rudolf Kötzschke(1867–1949) who was keen to accelerate the restoration of the university archive so that it might again be available as a research and teaching resource. However, the task of making the university archive accessible and usable was not a simple one. Most of the oldest records which had been dispersed to safer locations in the surrounding countryside had survived and the bomb-proof cellars of the Augusteum building had indeed protected the most valuable items in the collection, but the preserved items had for the most part subsequently been rescued by the Red Army and taken to the Soviet Union - whether as war booty or simply for safe keeping was not immediately apparent. The main building of the university archive had not survived a heavy aerial bombardment that had taken place overnight on 3/4 December 1943 (although its destruction had saved the adjacent university church from being engulfed in the fire that, aside from its cellars, had destroyed the Augusteum building).

Franke's longer term professional future continued to be the focus of disagreement. Between October 1948 and April 1949, he was provisionally placed on the payroll as university archivist even though this was contrary to the vote of the university's governing council. In June 1949, Karlheinz Blaschke was appointed to succeed him and made a start on retrieving the records. However, despite his subsequent distinguished career, in 1949, aged not quite 22, Blaschke had not yet attended the necessary archivists' course at Potsdam. It was not till 1950 that the final decision was taken to reject attempts to provide Franke with a permanent contract. His permanent successor was Renate Drucker. The articles that had been taken to the Soviet Union for safe keeping were returned to the University Archive only in 1958.
