= Alfred Franke =

World War II Luftwaffe fighter pilot (1918–1942)

- Born: 20 September 1918; Jena, German Empire
- Died: 9 September 1942 (aged 23); Stalingrad, Soviet Union
- Cause of death: Killed in action
- Military career
- Allegiance: Nazi Germany
- Branch: Luftwaffe
- Rank: Leutnant (posthumously)
- Unit: JG 53
- Conflicts: World War II: Battle of France; Battle of Britain; Operation Barbarossa; Siege of Leningrad
- Awards: Knight's Cross of the Iron Cross

Alfred Franke (20 September 1918 – 9 September 1942) was a German Luftwaffe ace and a posthumous recipient of the Knight's Cross of the Iron Cross during World War II. The Knight's Cross of the Iron Cross, and its variants were the highest awards in the military and paramilitary forces of Nazi Germany during World War II. As a fighter pilot, he was credited with 60 aerial victories, four on the Western Front and 56 on the Eastern Front.

== Early life and career ==
Frank was born on 20 September 1918 in Jena, then in Thuringia within the German Empire. He joined the military service of Luftwaffe and following flight training, (Note: Flight training in the Luftwaffe progressed through the levels A1, A2 and B1, B2, referred to as A/B flight training. A training included theoretical and practical training in aerobatics, navigation, long-distance flights and dead-stick landings. The B courses included high-altitude flights, instrument flights, night landings and training to handle the aircraft in difficult situations.) he was posted to Jagdgeschwader 53 (JG 53—53rd Fighter Wing) where he was assigned to 2. Staffel (1st squadron) in early 1940. At the time, the Staffel was commanded by Hauptmann Rolf Pingel and subordinated to I. Gruppe (1st group) which was headed by Hauptmann Lothar von Janson and based at Darmstadt-Griesheim Airfield.

== World War II ==
World War II in Europe had begun on Friday 1 September 1939 when German forces invaded Poland. On 10 May 1940, the first day of the Battle of France, I. Gruppe moved to Kirchberg. Flying from Kirchberg on 14 May, I. Gruppe flew missions in support of German forces fighting in the Battle of Sedan. That day, the Gruppe claimed 35 aerial victories, including the first two claims filed by Franke. On two separate missions, he claimed a Bloch MB.151 fighter and a Fairey Battle light bomber shot down south of Sedan.

On 6 June, I. Gruppe moved to Mannheim-Sandhofen Airfield. Following a maintenance overhaul of the aircraft, I. Gruppe moved to an airfield named Krzewicza located near Międzyrzec Podlaski, approximately 65 kilometers (40 miles) west of Brest, from 12 to 14 June.

=== Operation Barbarossa and Malta ===
On 22 June, the Geschwader crossed into Soviet airspace in support of Operation Barbarossa, the invasion of the Soviet Union, which opened the Eastern Front. I. Gruppe took off on its first mission at 3:40 am, escorting Junkers Ju 87 dive bombers. On 1 July, Franke was shot down in aerial combat behind enemy lines, resulting in a forced landing in his Messerschmitt Bf 109 F-2 (Werknummer 12621—factory number). Initially reported as missing in action, he later returned to his unit unhurt. On 16 July, he was shot down in his Bf 109 F-2 (Werknummer 5412) near Zhytomyr and was again reported as missing in action before returning unhurt.

=== Eastern Front and death ===
In early May 1942, I. Gruppe was transferred back to the Eastern Front. Prior to the relocation, the Gruppe received a full complement of 41 factory new Bf 109 F-4 aircraft at Schwäbisch Hall before heading for Prague Ruzyne Airfield on 28 May. The following day, I. Gruppe flew to Kursk. There, the Gruppe supported the German 4th Panzer Army in its advance towards Voronezh during Case Blue, the 1942 strategic summer offensive in southern Russia between 28 June and 24 November 1942.

On 9 September 1942, Franke was shot down in aerial combat with Ilyushin Il-2 ground-attack aircraft and anti-aircraft artillery. His Bf 109 G-2 (Werknummer 13442) north of Stalingrad. His victor may have been Kapitan Pavel S. Vinogradov of the 694 IAP, 228 ShAD. (Note: IAP—Istrebitelny Aviatsionny Polk (Fighter Aviation Regiment—Истребительный Авиационный Полк)) Posthumously, Franke was awarded the Knight's Cross of the Iron Cross (Ritterkreuz des Eisernen Kreuzes) on 29 October 1942 for 59 aerial victories claimed. He was also posthumously promoted to Leutnant (second lieutenant).

== Summary of career ==
=== Aerial victory claims ===
According to US historian David T. Zabecki, Franke was credited with 60 aerial victories. Mathews and Foreman, authors of Luftwaffe Aces — Biographies and Victory Claims, researched the German Federal Archives and found records for 58 aerial victory claims. This figure includes 54 aerial victories on the Eastern Front and four over the Western Allies.

Victory claims were logged to a map-reference (PQ = Planquadrat), for example "PQ 40773". The Luftwaffe grid map (Jägermeldenetz) covered all of Europe, western Russia and North Africa and was composed of rectangles measuring 15 minutes of latitude by 30 minutes of longitude, an area of about 360 square miles (930 km^{2}). These sectors were then subdivided into 36 smaller units to give a location area 3 km × 4 km (1.9 mi × 2.5 mi) in size.

Chronicle of aerial victories
This and the ? (question mark) indicates information discrepancies listed by Prien, Stemmer, Rodeike, Bock, Mathews and Foreman.
Claim	Date	Time	Type	Location	Claim	Date	Time	Type	Location
– 2. Staffel of Jagdgeschwader 53 – Battle of France — 10 May – 25 June 1940
1	14 May 1940	11:20	MB.151	south of Sedan	3	31 May 1940	20:12	DB-7	vicinity of Saint-Quentin
2	14 May 1940	16:20	Battle	south of Sedan					
– 2. Staffel of Jagdgeschwader 53 – At the Channel and over England — 26 June 1940 – 6 June 1941
4	18 August 1940	15:32	Hurricane						
– 2. Staffel of Jagdgeschwader 53 – Operation Barbarossa — 22 June – 7 August 1941
5? (Note: This claim is not listed by Mathews and Foreman.)	22 June 1941	17:37	Douglas	west-southwest of Brest-Litovsk	9	10 July 1941	12:17	DB-3	
6	24 June 1941	09:32	SB-3		10	24 July 1941? (Note: According to Mathews and Foreman claimed at 16:40 on 25 July 1941.)	14:16?	DB-3	
7	24 June 1941	09:34	SB-3		11	26 July 1941	10:45	DB-3	east of Bila Tserkva
8	6 July 1941	06:37	DB-3		12	26 July 1941	11:00	(Il-2)	
– 2. Staffel of Jagdgeschwader 53 – Eastern Front — 28 May 1942 – 9 September 1942
13	10 June 1942	15:37	I-61 (MiG-3)		37	20 August 1942	10:59	Il-2	PQ 40773; 25 km (16 mi) northwest of Gumrak
14	24 June 1942	03:41	R-10		38	21 August 1942	12:39	U-2	PQ 49881
15	27 June 1942	09:16	MiG-1	10 km (6.2 mi) north-northeast of Schtschigry	39	22 August 1942	09:40	Il-2	PQ 30894
16	28 June 1942	04:06	MiG-1		40	23 August 1942	05:43	I-180	PQ 49153
17	1 July 1942	12:01	P-39		41	24 August 1942	13:02	U-2	PQ 49244; 10 km (6.2 mi) northeast of Stalingrad
18	1 July 1942	12:08	P-39		42	28 August 1942	14:35? (Note: According to Mathews and Foreman claimed at 14:38.)	MiG-1	PQ 40891; 40 km (25 mi) northeast of Stalingrad
19	26 July 1942	13:43	LaGG-3		43	28 August 1942	14:44	LaGG-3	PQ 50781; 60 km (37 mi) east-northeast of Stalingrad
20	31 July 1942	13:59	MiG-1	PQ 39194; 15 km (9.3 mi) west-northwest of Kalach	44	29 August 1942	12:49	P-40	PQ 49251
21	2 August 1942	12:29	Il-2	PQ 39163; 15 km (9.3 mi) south-southwest of Kalach	45	29 August 1942	12:56	MiG-1	PQ 49243
22	2 August 1942	12:38	MiG-1	PQ 39281; 15 km (9.3 mi) east-northeast of Kalach	46	30 August 1942	16:10	I-180	PQ 49562
23	4 August 1942	11:30	MiG-1	PQ 49753	47	1 September 1942	10:45	Il-2	PQ 49253
24	12 August 1942	04:27	Il-2	PQ 29894	48	1 September 1942	10:46	Il-2	PQ 49324
25	12 August 1942	04:33	Il-2	PQ 39773	49	1 September 1942	15:43	Pe-2	PQ 49132
26	12 August 1942	04:39	LaGG-3	PQ 39772	50	3 September 1942	13:46	Yak-1	PQ 40873
27	12 August 1942	10:48	MiG-3	PQ 49882	51	4 September 1942	11:19	I-16	PQ 49361
28	13 August 1942	17:41	Il-2	PQ 39333	52	5 September 1942	05:35	MiG-1	PQ 49431
29	13 August 1942	17:44	MiG-1	PQ 39194	53	7 September 1942	13:30	Il-2	PQ 49283
30	13 August 1942	17:51	Il-2	northeast of Kalach	54	7 September 1942	17:16	I-153	PQ 49272
31	14 August 1942	10:44	Il-2		55	8 September 1942	06:44	Il-2	PQ 49391
32	18 August 1942	05:33	MiG-3	PQ 49164	56	8 September 1942	06:46	Il-2	PQ 49412
33	18 August 1942	12:48	Il-2	PQ 40771; 25 km (16 mi) northwest of Gumrak	57	8 September 1942	06:49	Il-2	PQ 49332
34	18 August 1942	12:53	MiG-3	PQ 40772; 25 km (16 mi) northwest of Gumrak	58	9 September 1942	13:48	Il-2	PQ 49182
35	19 August 1942	15:42	Er-2	PQ 40774; 25 km (16 mi) northwest of Gumrak	59	9 September 1942	13:57	Il-2	PQ 49161
36	20 August 1942	10:56	Il-2	PQ 30894					

=== Awards ===
- Iron Cross (1939) 2nd Class and 1st Class
- Honor Goblet of the Luftwaffe on 13 September 1942 as Oberfeldwebel and pilot
- German Cross in Gold on 25 September 1942 as Oberfeldwebel in the I./Jagdgeschwader 53
- Knight's Cross of the Iron Cross on 29 October 1942 as Oberfeldwebel and pilot in the 2./Jagdgeschwader 53
