= Gerhard Franke =

German painter

Gerhard Franke (24 April 1926 – 22 October 2002) was a German painter.

== Biography ==
Franke was born in Lugau in Sachsen and grew up in Chemnitz. After completing his Abitur, he studied art in Leipzig at the Staatlichen Akademie für graphische Künste und Buchgewerbe, where he was a student of Elisabeth Voigt and then cello at the University of Music and Theatre Leipzig. After a wrist injury that ended his music career, he dedicated himself to painting but soon came into conflict with the repressive East German regime, wanting to do abstract painting, instead of the state sanctioned Socialist Realism. After years of teaching art at small country schools in Thuringia, Franke and his wife, Ute, established a successful ceramics business in 1966. Freed from relying on any official Communist support, his abstract work from the 1960s and 70s was often critical of the Stasi and depicted primitive, abstract creatures caught in a web of state oppression, thus he never exhibited in the GDR. After German Reunification, Franke turned toward figurative paintings set in the countryside around the castle of Arnshaugk, near Neustadt an der Orla, where he had lived as a recluse until his death in 2002.
