= Josef Franke =

German architect

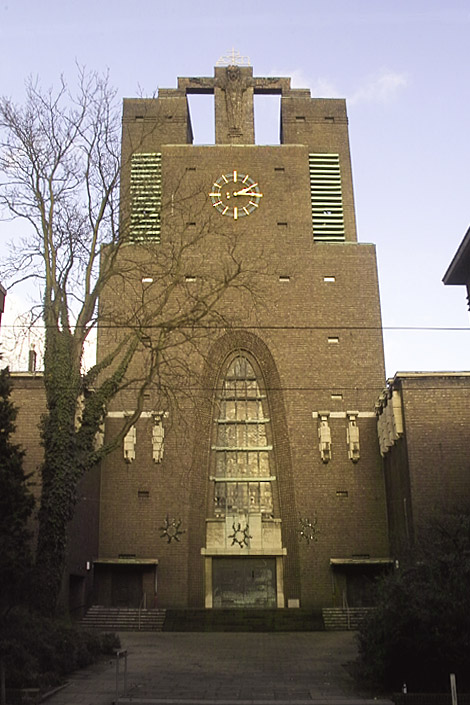
- Heilig-Kreuz-Kirche in Gelsenkirchen-Ückendorf
- Born: 12 March 1876; Wattenscheid, Germany
- Died: 16 January 1944 (aged 67); Gelsenkirchen, Germany
- Occupation: Architect

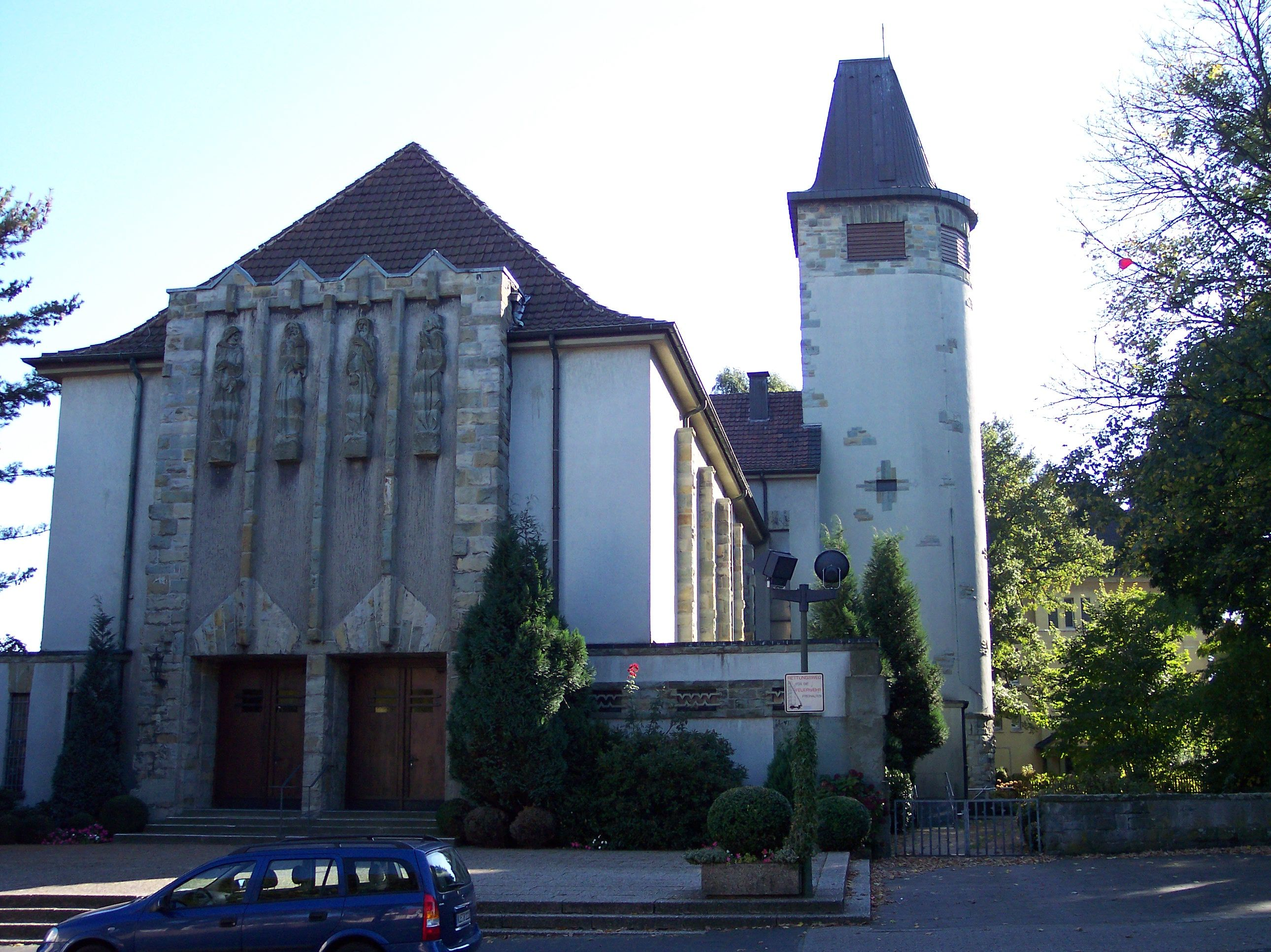
Christus-König-Kirche in Oer-Erkenschwick by Josef Franke

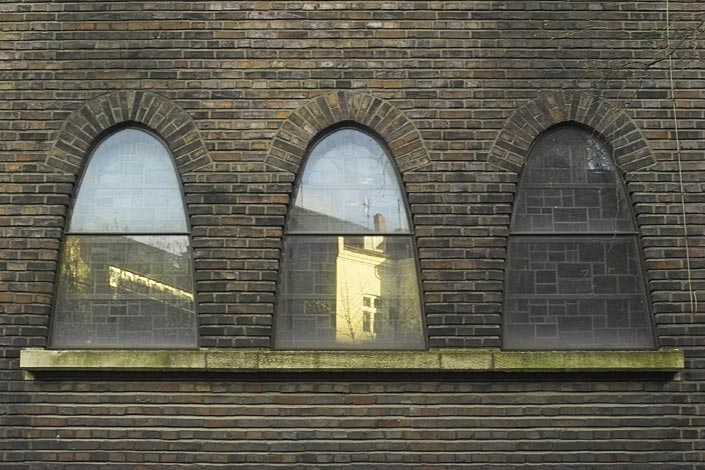
Heilig-Kreuz-Kirche in Gelsenkirchen-Ückendorf by Josef Franke - Detail

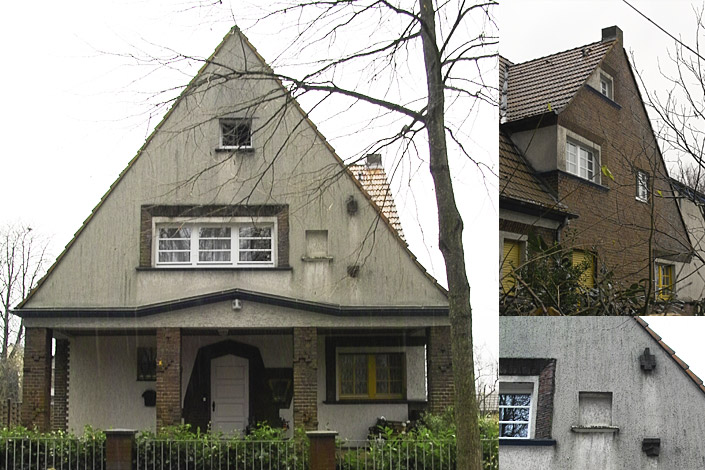
Wohnhaus für Anrdreas Ballin in Gelsenkirchen-Bulmke by Josef Franke

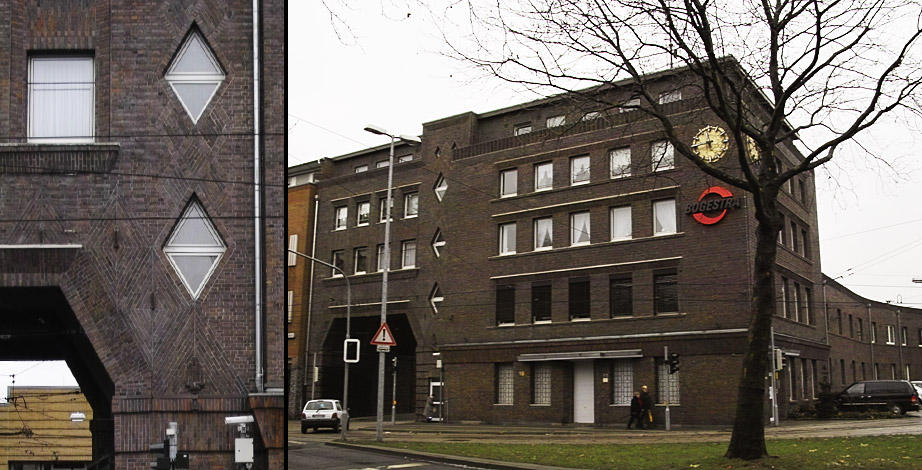
Strassenbahn-Betriebshof in Gelsenkirchen by Josef Franke

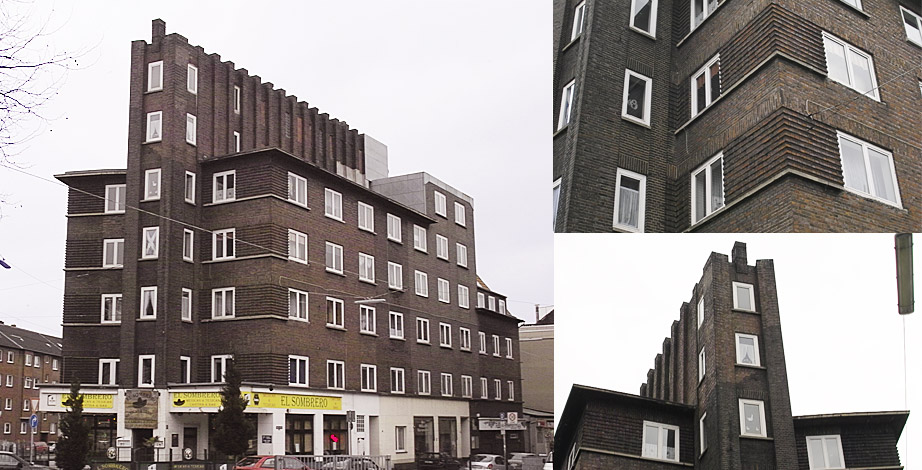
Ring-Eck-Haus in Gelsenkirchen by Josef Franke

Josef Franke (12 March 1876 – 16 January 1944) was a German architect. He created a number of sacred and secular buildings in the Ruhrgebiet, particularly in Gelsenkirchen. He is noted for his work in the 1920s in the brick-expressionist style.

== Life ==
After leaving school, Franke studied at the Höxter Baugewerkschule (English: building trade school) and then at the Technical University of Charlottenburg as a guest student. After completing his training he first was employed at the council structural engineering office in Cologne, and later in the architect's office of Max and Carl Anton Meckel in Freiburg im Breisgau. In 1904 he set up on his own in Gelsenkirchen. Frankes second own house, completed in 1909, is located in Gelsenkirchen in the Robert-Koch-Straße. In recent years, Frankes work in Gelsenkirchen has been rediscovered and re-evaluated by exhibitions and publications. His daughter is the Interior designer and Artist Margarete Franke.

== Architectural style ==
Franke's most popular buildings were designed in the Brick-expressionist style, which was common in the 1920s Germany. They are characterized by the use of reddish brown brick and its setting to patterns and plastic elements on Facades, added to mostly rhythmic surface schemes. Playing with the angular, raw stone leads to a special charm, completed by carefully balanced total composition. Also the contemporary liking for triangle and parabola forms reflects in his designs of this period.

== Buildings (selected) ==
- House for the painter Andreas Wilhelm Ballin, 1925, Gelsenkirchen-Bulmke
- Blumendelle housing scheme, 1926, Gelsenkirchen-Schalke
- Tram Depot for the Bochum-Gelsenkirchener Straßenbahnen AG, 1927, Gelsenkirchen-Mitte
- "Ring-Eck" residential building with shops, 1928, Gelsenkirchen-Mitte
- Catholic parish church "Heilig-Kreuz", 1929, Gelsenkirchen-Ückendorf
- "Aloysianum" girls' high school, today "Ricarda Huch Gymnasium", 1930, Gelsenkirchen-Bulmke
