= Andre Franke =

German geneticist

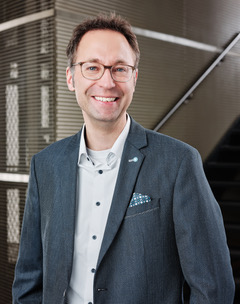
- Born: October 16, 1978 (age 47)
- Citizenship: German, American
- Occupations: Geneticist, academic, and full university professor

Academic background
- Education: Diploma in Biology, Doctor rerum naturalium in Genetics
- Alma mater: Christian-Albrechts-University of Kiel
- Thesis: A systematic genome-wide association analysis for Inflammatory Bowel Diseases (2006)

Andre Franke, born on 16 October 1978, is a geneticist, academic, and university professor. He is a Full W3 Professor of Molecular Medicine at the Christian-Albrechts-University of Kiel, and a managing director at the Institute of Clinical Molecular Biology.

Franke is most known for his work on genetics, genome-wide association studies, microbiome, and internal medicine research. He integrates bioinformatics developments with novel technologies, chronic inflammatory diseases, and has studied the genetic architecture of different complex diseases and traits.

== Education ==
Franke enrolled at the Christian-Albrecht University of Kiel and graduated with a Diploma in Biology in 2003. From 2004 until 2006, he undertook research in complex disease genetics for a Doctor rerum naturalium at the Institute of Clinical Molecular Biology under the supervision of Stefan Schreiber and Thomas C.G. Bosch. His dissertation was titled "A systematic genome-wide association analysis for Inflammatory Bowel Diseases."

== Career ==
Following his doctor rerum naturalium degree and a short postdoc, Franke started his academic career as an assistant professor for Epithelial Barrier Diseases funded by the DFG Cluster of Excellence 306 between 2008 and 2011.

While mentored by Richard S. Blumberg, Franke also served as a guest scientist at the Broad Institute of MIT and Harvard in Boston in 2011. He was promoted to a full W3 professorship and has been holding this appointment since 2016.

Since 2011, Franke has been the Director of the Institute of Clinical Molecular Biology.

== Research ==
Franke has authored over 730 publications, and has a Web of science h-index of 110. His research focus includes genetics/genomics/immunogenetics, bioinformatics, the human microbiome, and high-throughput sequencing technologies. He has worked on genome-wide association studies, single-nucleotide polymorphism-based analyses, and complex diseases. He has explored the aspects of genetic architecture, genetic variability, and population genetics whereas his main disease focus has been inflammatory bowel diseases, including Crohn's disease and ulcerative colitis. Other research foci have been the diseases psoriasis and primary sclerosing cholangitis.

=== Genome wide association study ===
Franke's work in genome wide association studies mainly focused on the identification of susceptibility genes in inflammatory diseases such as Crohn's disease and ulcerative colitis. During his PhD in 2006, he performed the first genome-wide association scan of nonsynonymous SNPs in a case-control panel with Crohn's disease patients and control individuals. The identification of a Crohn's-associated coding SNP in the ATG16L1 led to the description that autophagy is an important pathway that is impaired in patients with Crohn's disease. A 2010 research study which undertook the genome-wide association meta-analysis and replication study for Crohn's disease identified 71 novel loci that are associated with the disease, further completing the genetic architecture of inflammatory bowel diseases. Later on, Franke joined the International IBD Genetics Consortium (IIBDGC) where he is on the Management Committee.

Franke conducted systematic trans-ethnic association studies for IBD including people of European, East Asian, Indian, and Iranian descent. Besides performing traditional genome-wide association analyses, he also systematically investigated the human leukocyte antigen (HLA) region in IBD cohorts of different ethnicities.

Franke has also investigated the genetics of psoriasis. He performed several genetic association studies for this disease. Additional research centered on risk assessment of psoriatic arthritis development in psoriasis patients, highlighting that underlying genetic differences between psoriasis subtypes can be used for individualized subtype risk assessments. He also contributed to a study that aimed to identify genetic variants for gallstone disease. Through transcript mapping, mutation detection, and association analysis in an ethnically different population, rs11887534 (ABCG8-D19H) was identified as a disease-relevant factor.

In 2020, during the first wave of the Corona virus epidemic, Franke investigated the genetic susceptibility to SARS-CoV-2 and also tried to identify genetic factors that contribute to the variation and development of COVID-19 such as disease severity. This first genome-wide association study for COVID-19 identified the ABO blood-group system as a factor for susceptibility for SARS-CoV-2 infection whereas variants in the gene cluster on chromosome 3p21.31 were determined as important factors for disease severity.

Franke further coordinated genetic studies that led to the identification of the first disease genes for chronic venous disease and hemorrhoids disease (first 102 disease loci for this disease).

=== Microbiome studies ===
Later in his career he focused on sequence analysis of the microbiome, which could at that point in time be analyzed using culture-free sequence-based analyses. In an interview with the German Centre for Research and Innovation – New York, he addressed that his current work aims to pinpoint "the relevant genes in the human genome that may be involved in host-microbiome interactions." Important scientific contributions were the first microbiome genome-wide association studies (mGWAS) that led to the identification of different genes and variants in the human genome that are involved in host-bacterial interaction. Significant genes findings in these studies were the Vitamin D Receptor (VDR) and ABO blood group genes.

== Awards and honors ==
- 2008 – Hensel Prize, CAU Kiel
- 2011 – Janssen Prize, Janssen Dermatology
- 2011 – W2 Peter Hans-Hofschneider endowment professorship, Foundation of Experimental Biomedicine
- 2012 – Ludwig-Demling Research Prize, German Crohn's and Colitis Foundation
- 2017 – Thannhauser Prize, DGVS (German Society for Digestive and Metabolic Diseases)
- 2017 – Schleswig-Holstein Excellence Chair, Cluster of Excellence "Inflammation at Interfaces"
- 2020 – Petersen Foundation Innovation and Transfer Prize

== Bibliography ==
- Hampe, J., Franke, A., Rosenstiel, P., Till, A., Teuber, M., Huse, K., ... & Schreiber, S. (2007). A genome-wide association scan of nonsynonymous SNPs identifies a susceptibility variant for Crohn disease in ATG16L1. Nature genetics, 39(2), 207–211.
- Franke, A., McGovern, D. P., Barrett, J. C., Wang, K., Radford-Smith, G. L., Ahmad, T., ... & Parkes, M. (2010). Genome-wide meta-analysis increases to 71 the number of confirmed Crohn's disease susceptibility loci. Nature genetics, 42(12), 1118–1125.
- Fischer, U., Forster, M., Rinaldi, A., Risch, T., Sungalee, S., Warnatz, H. J., ... & Yaspo, M. L. (2015). Genomics and drug profiling of fatal TCF3-HLF− positive acute lymphoblastic leukemia identifies recurrent mutation patterns and therapeutic options. Nature genetics, 47(9), 1020–1029.
- Wang, J., Thingholm, L. B., Skiecevičienė, J., Rausch, P., Kummen, M., Hov, J. R., ... & Franke, A. (2016). Genome-wide association analysis identifies variation in vitamin D receptor and other host factors influencing the gut microbiota. Nature genetics, 48(11), 1396–1406.
- Severe COVID-19 GWAS Group. (2020). Genomewide association study of severe COVID-19 with respiratory failure. New England Journal of Medicine, 383(16), 1522–1534.
- Rühlemann, M. C., Hermes, B. M., Bang, C., Doms, S., Moitinho-Silva, L., Thingholm, L. B., ... & Franke, A. (2021). Genome-wide association study in 8,956 German individuals identifies influence of ABO histo-blood groups on gut microbiome. Nature Genetics, 53(2), 147–155.
