= Alfred Sittard =

German cantor, composer and organist (1878 - 1942)

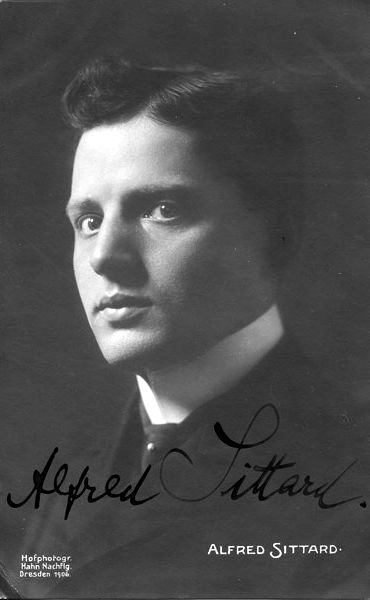
Alfred Sittard 1906

Alfred Sittard (4 November 1878 –– 31 March 1942) was a German cantor, composer of church music and one of the most important organists of his time.

== Life and career ==
Born in Stuttgart, Sittard was a pupil of his father, the music teacher and musicologist Josef Sittard (1846-1903), as well as the Hamburg Petri-Cantor Wilhelm Köhler-Wümbach (1858–1926) and the Petri-organist Carl Armbrust (1849-1896).

In 1896 and 1897, after the early death of Armbrust, he took over his post as a primate of the Gelehrtenschule des Johanneums. From 1897 to 1901 Sittard studied at the Hochschule für Musik und Tanz Köln with Friedrich Wilhelm Franke, Franz Wüllner and Isidor Seiß. He worked as a volunteer conductor at the Hamburg State Opera from 1901 to 1902 and was awarded the Mendelssohn Scholarship for composition in 1902. In 1903 he became organist at the Kreuzkirche in Dresden, then in 1912 organist at the newly rebuilt St. Michael's Church, Hamburg with the then largest church organ of Eberhard Friedrich Walcker. He founded the choir at the Michaelis Church and conducted the Hamburger Lehrergesangverein from 1920 to 1925. In 1925 he was appointed professor for organ playing at the Royal Music Institute of Berlin. From 1933 he was also the director of the Staats- und Domchor Berlin.

As an organ virtuoso he toured Romania, Spain, Holland, Belgium, Hungary, Italy, Czechoslovakia, Russia and Sweden.

On April 1, 1942, he wanted to retire, but died unexpectedly on his last working day in Berlin at age 63.

There exists numerous recordings by Sittard on shellac records and on piano rolls for the philharmonic organs of the Welte & Söhne company. His name is remembered at the Universität der Künste Berlin with the Sittard Foundation, founded in 1974, which also awards scholarships to underprivileged organ students. His grave (family grave) is located at the Hamburg Ohlsdorf Cemetery

== Work ==
- Several compositions for organ and choir
- Das Hauptorgelwerk und die Hilfsorgel der großen St. Michaelis-Kirche in Hamburg. Hamburg, Boysen & Maasch, 1912
- Zur Entwicklung des Orgelspiels. In Pädagogische Reform 44 (1920), pp. 264–265 Online-Version on Bildungsgeschichte Online.
- Alt-Hamburgs Kirchenmusik. In Bachheft, Hamburg, Böhme, 1921, p. 196.

== Documents ==
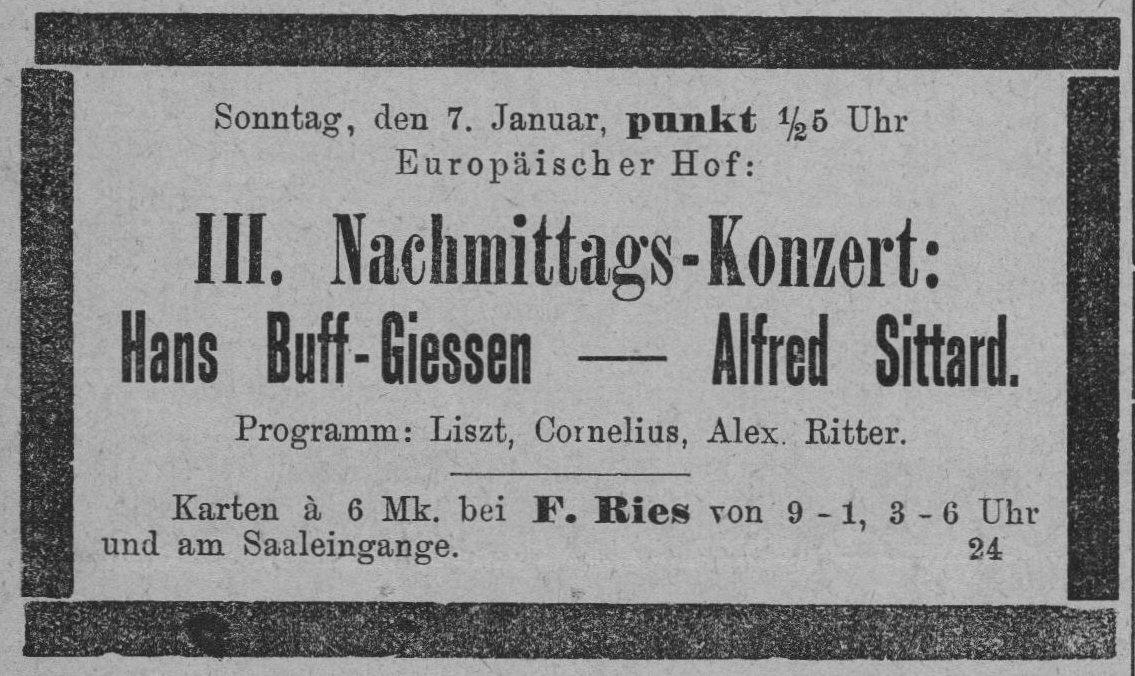
Newspaper announcement 1906

Letters from Alfred Sittard are in the collection of the Leipziger Musikverlag C. F. Peters im Staatsarchiv Leipzig.
