= Franke Onsrud =

Norwegian sports shooter (1885–1945)

Personal information
- Full name: August Hermann Franke Onsrud
- Born: 19 October 1885 Vestre Toten, Norway
- Died: 4 October 1945 (aged 59) Vestre Toten, Norway

Sport
- Sport: Sports shooting
- Club: Oslo Østre SL

August Hermann Franke Onsrud (19 October 1885 – 4 October 1945) was a Norwegian sports shooter. He competed in two events at the 1924 Summer Olympics.
