= Friedrich Wilhelm Franke =

German organist (1862–1932)

Friedrich Wilhelm Franke (21 June 1862 – 3 April 1932) was a German organist.

Born in Barmen (today a district of Wuppertal), Franke worked as a teacher for pipe organ, harmony and counterpoint at the Hochschule für Musik und Tanz Köln. Among other things, he was organist for the Gürzenich Orchestra Cologne and numerous Rhenish music festivals. His life's work was dedicated to the efforts of renewal within the evangelical church music. He has rendered outstanding services to the revival of old Protestant forms of church music. Among his students were the church musicians Father Gregor Schwake OSB and Alfred Sittard.

Franke died in Cologne at the age of 69.
