= Banknotes of the Swiss franc =

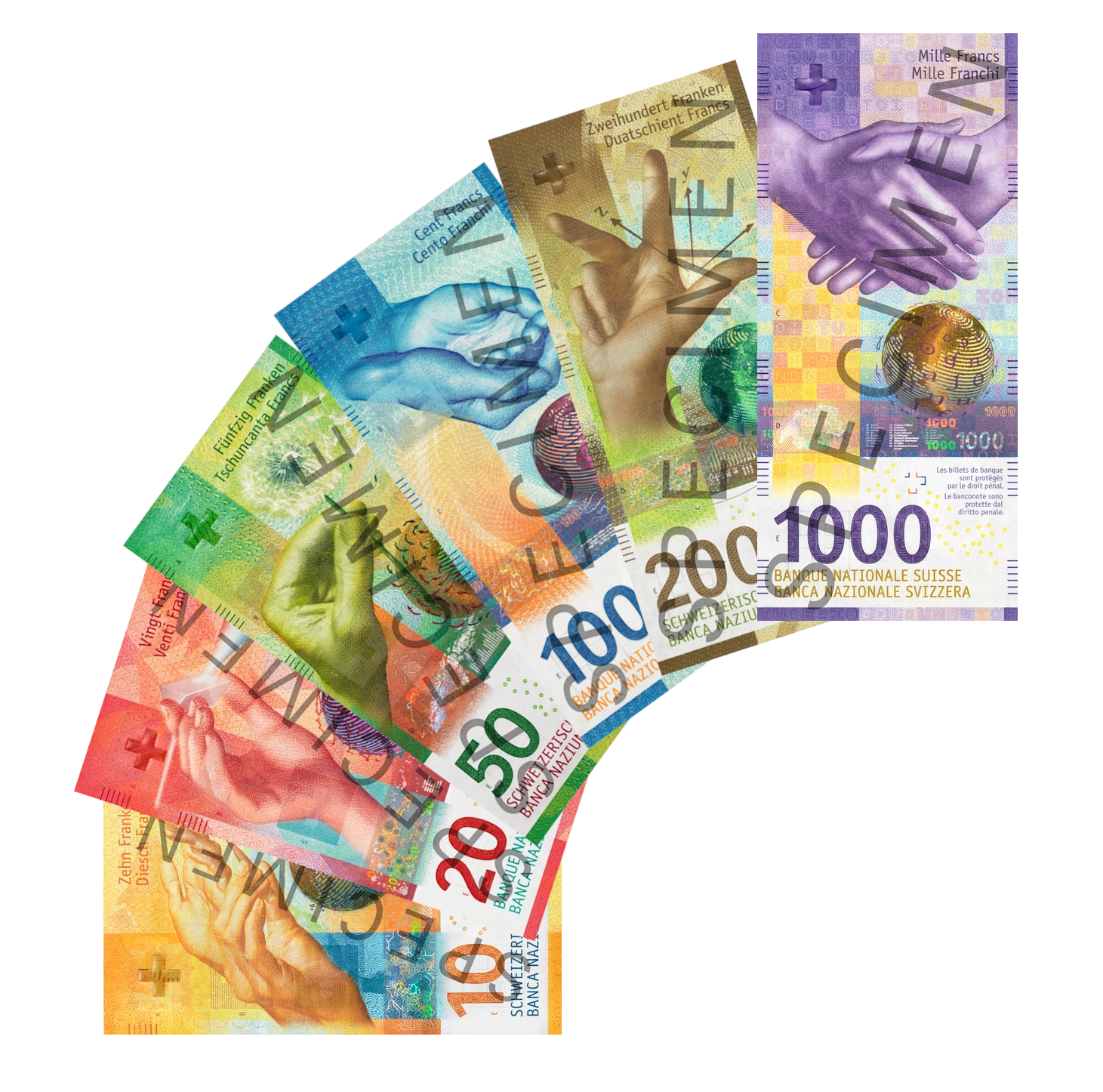
The ninth series of the Swiss franc, currently in circulation. As of March 2026, the Swiss 1,000-franc banknote is the world's 3rd highest valued banknote in circulation, after Brunei's $10,000 bill (worth around 6,150 CHF in March 2026), followed by Singapore's $10,000 bill (worth around 6,100 CHF).

Banknotes of the Swiss franc (CHF) are issued by the Swiss National Bank in denominations of 10, 20, 50, 100, 200 and 1,000 Swiss francs.

Between 2016 and 2019, the eighth series, while remaining valid, was being replaced by the ninth series. All banknotes starting from the sixth series are exchangeable; banknotes of the fifth series ceased to be valid and were fully demonetised on 1 May 2000.

== History ==
The first banknotes in Switzerland were issued in 1825 by the Deposito-Cassa der Stadt Bern (in the city of Bern).

During the 19th century the cantons (states) of Switzerland had the right to print their own notes. Following the law of 8 March 1881, the Swiss National Bank obtained the exclusive right to issue banknotes in Switzerland. Its first notes were issued in 1907. Since then, nine series of Swiss franc notes have been printed, six of which have been released for use by the general public, with a new series beginning release in 2016.

Switzerland is unusual among affluent countries in that it used to expire its banknotes; the Swiss National Bank has declared several older series of banknotes to be no longer legal tender some time after introducing newer series. Notes from these "recalled" series could be exchanged for still-valid notes at the National Bank for up to 20 years after the date of recall, after which the notes would lose their fungible value. When the recalled series become valueless, the National Bank would transfer an amount of money equal to the sum of the newly worthless notes to a state-run last-resort disaster insurance fund, the Swiss Fund for Aid in Cases of Uninsurable Damage by Natural Forces. In June 2019, the Swiss parliament passed a bill that removed the twenty-year time limit. Effective 1 January 2020, all banknotes starting from the sixth series issued in 1976 as well as any future series remain valid and can be exchanged for current notes indefinitely.

In April 2021, the Swiss National Bank announced that it was recalling its eighth series of banknotes issued between 1995 and 1998; the series was replaced by the ninth series launched between 2016 and 2019. In May 2021, the old banknotes lost their status as legal tender and are no longer valid for payments.

== Overview ==
Overview of all series of Swiss banknotes
| Series | Introduced | Recalled | Valueless since | Designer(s) | Remarks |
|---|---|---|---|---|---|
| 1st | 1907 | 1 July 1925 | 1 July 1945 | Josef Storck and Albert Walch | Changeover notes, similar to notes used by earlier banks |
| 2nd | 1911 | 1 October 1958 | 1 October 1978 | Eugène Burnand, Ferdinand Hodler, S. Balzer | |
| 3rd | 1918 | 1 July 1925 | 1 July 1945 | Orell Füssli | War notes; only partially issued |
| 4th | — | — | — | Victor Surbeck and Hans Erni | Reserve series, never issued |
| 5th | 1956 | 1 May 1980 | 1 May 2000 | Pierre Gauchat and Marcus Korsten | |
| 6th | 1976 | 1 May 2000 | — | Ernst and Ursula Hiestand | No longer legal tender, can be exchanged at full nominal value at Swiss National Bank |
| 7th | — | — | — | Elisabeth and Roger Pfund | Reserve series; never issued |
| 8th | 1995 to 1998 | 30 April 2021 | — | Jörg Zintzmeyer | |
| 9th | 12 April 2016 | — | — | Manuela Pfrunder | Current series; introduced 2016 to 2019 |

== All series of Swiss banknotes ==
=== First series ===
1st series of Swiss banknotes
| Image | | Value | Dimensions | Main colour | Description | | Date of | | |
| Obverse | Reverse | Value | Dimensions | Main colour | Obverse | Reverse | issue | withdrawal | lapse |
|---|---|---|---|---|---|---|---|---|---|
| | | 50 francs | 166 × 103 mm | Green/Yellow | Helvetia | Ornaments | 20 June 1907 | 1 July 1925 | 1 July 1945 |
| | | 100 francs | 183 × 116 mm | Blue | Helvetia | Ornaments | 20 June 1907 | 1 July 1925 | 1 July 1945 |
| | | 500 francs | 199 × 126 mm | Green | Helvetia | Ornaments | 20 June 1907 | 1 July 1925 | 1 July 1945 |
| | | 1000 francs | 215 × 132 mm | Purple | Helvetia | Ornaments | 20 June 1907 | 1 July 1925 | 1 July 1945 |
These images are to scale at 0.7 pixel per millimetre (18 pixel per inch). For table standards, see the banknote specification table.

=== Second series ===
The second series of Swiss banknotes was issued between 1911 and 1914.

2nd series of Swiss banknotes
| Image | | Value | Dimensions | Main colour | Description | | Date of | | | Notes |
| Obverse | Reverse | Value | Dimensions | Main colour | Obverse | Reverse | issue | withdrawal | lapse | Notes |
|---|---|---|---|---|---|---|---|---|---|---|
| | | 5 francs | 148 × 70 mm | Brown/Green | William Tell | Ornaments | 3 August 1914 | 1 May 1980 | 1 May 2000 | |
| | | 10 francs | 135 × 82 mm | Brown/Yellow | Woman from Neuchâtel | Ornaments | — | | | Reserve note |
| | | 20 francs | 163 × 95 mm | Blue/purple | Vreneli | Ornaments | 31 July 1914 | 31 December 1935 | 1 January 1956 | |
| | | 50 francs | 165 × 106 mm | Green | Woman's head | Woodcutter | 22 December 1911 | 1 October 1958 | 1 October 1978 | |
| | | 100 francs | 181 × 115 mm | Dark blue | Woman's head | Reaper | 16 September 1911 | 1 October 1958 | 1 October 1978 | |
| | | 500 francs | 200 × 125 mm | Red/Brown | Woman's head | Embroideres | 24 December 1912 | 1 October 1958 | 1 October 1978 | |
| | | 1000 francs | 216 × 131 mm | Purple | Woman's head | Foundry | 16 September 1911 | 1 October 1958 | 1 October 1978 | |
These images are to scale at 0.7 pixel per millimetre (18 pixel per inch). For table standards, see the banknote specification table.

=== Third series ===
The third series of Swiss banknotes was printed in 1918; some of the notes were issued as war notes, while others were kept as reserve.

=== Fourth series ===
The fourth series of Swiss banknotes was printed in 1938 as a reserve series and was never issued.

4th series of Swiss banknotes
| Image | | Value | Dimensions | Main colour | Description | | Date of issue |
| Obverse | Reverse | Value | Dimensions | Main colour | Obverse | Reverse | Date of issue |
|---|---|---|---|---|---|---|---|
| | | 50 francs | 167 × 96 mm | Green | Woman's head | Bull | Never issued (reserve series) |
| | | 100 francs | 190 × 106 mm | Blue | Woman from Haslital | Ornaments | Never issued (reserve series) |
| | | 500 francs | 210 × 116 mm | Brown-red | Woman's head | Chemistry | Never issued (reserve series) |
| | | 1000 francs | 228 × 125 mm | Purple | Woman's head | Turbine | Never issued (reserve series) |
These images are to scale at 0.7 pixel per millimetre (18 pixel per inch). For table standards, see the banknote specification table.

=== Fifth series ===
The fifth series of Swiss banknotes was issued starting in 1957.

5th series of Swiss banknotes
| Image | | Value | Dimensions | Main colour | Description | | Designer | Date of | | |
| Obverse | Reverse | Value | Dimensions | Main colour | Obverse | Reverse | Designer | issue | withdrawal | lapse |
|---|---|---|---|---|---|---|---|---|---|---|
| | | 10 francs | 137 × 75 mm | Red-brown | Gottfried Keller | Bennet blossoms | Hermann Eidenbenz | 1 October 1956 | 1 May 1980 | 1 May 2000 |
| | | 20 francs | 155 × 85 mm | Blue | Guillaume-Henri Dufour | Thistle | Hermann Eidenbenz | 29 March 1956 | 1 May 1980 | 1 May 2000 |
| | | 50 francs | 173 × 95 mm | Green | Head of a girl | Apple harvest | Pierre Gauchat | 14 June 1957 | 1 May 1980 | 1 May 2000 |
| | | 100 francs | 191 × 105 mm | Dark blue | Head of a boy | St Martin | Pierre Gauchat | 14 June 1957 | 1 May 1980 | 1 May 2000 |
| | | 500 francs | 210 × 115 mm | Brown-red | Head of a woman | Fountain of Youth | Pierre Gauchat | 14 June 1957 | 1 May 1980 | 1 May 2000 |
| | | 1000 francs | 228 × 125 mm | Purple | Head of a woman | Danse Macabre | Pierre Gauchat | 14 June 1957 | 1 May 1980 | 1 May 2000 |
These images are to scale at 0.7 pixel per millimetre (18 pixel per inch). For table standards, see the banknote specification table.

=== Sixth series ===
6th series of Swiss banknotes
| Image | | Value | Dimensions | Main colour | Description | | Date of | | |
| Obverse | Reverse | Value | Dimensions | Main colour | Obverse | Reverse | issue | withdrawal | lapse |
|---|---|---|---|---|---|---|---|---|---|
| | | 10 francs | 137 × 66 mm | Red | Leonhard Euler | Water turbine, the Solar System and a scheme of propagation of rays of light passing through lenses | 5 November 1979 | 1 May 2000 | none (abolished) |
| | | 20 francs | 148 × 70 mm | Blue | Horace-Bénédict de Saussure | Mountain range, a group of alpinists and the Ammonshorn | 4 April 1979 | 1 May 2000 | none (abolished) |
| | | 50 francs | 159 × 74 mm | Green | Conrad Gessner | Eagle owl, primula, stars | 4 October 1978 | 1 May 2000 | none (abolished) |
| | | 100 francs | 170 × 78 mm | Dark blue | Francesco Borromini | Upper part of the dome-tower as well as the floor plan of the church Sant'Ivo alla Sapienza | 4 October 1976 | 1 May 2000 | none (abolished) |
| | | 500 francs | 181 × 82 mm | Brown | Albrecht von Haller | Muscular figure of a human body, graph of respiration and the circulation of the blood, and a purple orchis | 4 April 1977 | 1 May 2000 | none (abolished) |
| | | 1000 francs | 192 × 86 mm | Purple | Auguste Forel | Three ants and a cross-section of an anthill | 4 April 1978 | 1 May 2000 | none (abolished) |
These images are to scale at 0.7 pixel per millimetre (18 pixel per inch). For table standards, see the banknote specification table.

=== Seventh series ===
A seventh series of Swiss banknotes was designed and printed in 1984, in parallel with the sixth series, but was never released. It formed the reserve series, to be released, for example, if the current series were suddenly to become widely counterfeited. At first, almost no information was released on the series for security reasons, except for small fragments. However, after the eighth series was released, it was decided to improve the security features of the current series rather than develop a new reserve series. The details of the seventh series were later released, while the actual banknotes were destroyed. The designers were Roger Pfund and Elisabeth Pfund. They had originally won the competition for the design of the sixth series, but since the Swiss National Bank decided to use the design by Ernst and Ursula Hiestand instead, the Pfunds were charged with the design of the reserve series.

7th series of Swiss banknotes
| Image | | Value | Dimensions | Main colour | Description | | Date of issue |
| Obverse | Reverse | Value | Dimensions | Main colour | Obverse | Reverse | Date of issue |
|---|---|---|---|---|---|---|---|
| | | 10 francs | 137 × 66 mm | Red-brown | Leonhard Euler; development of the polyhedron, the bridges of Königsberg | Gamma function; table for the calculation of numbers; diagram of the Solar System | Never issued (reserve series) |
| | | 20 francs | 148 × 70 mm | Blue | Horace-Bénédict de Saussure; quartz crystals; Hornblende beam | Hair hygrometer, view of the valley of Chamonix and the Mont Blanc massif; expedition to the Tacul glacier | Never issued (reserve series) |
| | | 50 francs | 159 × 74 mm | Green | Conrad Gessner; branch of a dwarf cherry tree; foliage of the bush | Golden eagle (based on a woodcut from Gessner's Historiae animalium); "Metamorphosis of animals"; Latin text from the Historiae Animalium referring to the seven-headed hydra | Never issued (reserve series) |
| | | 100 francs | 170 × 78 mm | Dark blue | Francesco Borromini; architectural motif from the Basilica of St. John Lateran | Raising of the lantern and the spire of Sant'Ivo alla Sapienza; floor plan of San Carlo alle Quattro Fontane; dove and olive branch | Never issued (reserve series) |
| | | 500 francs | 181 × 82 mm | Brown | Albrecht von Haller; hexagonal structure of the cell; cell tissue | 18th century anatomy plate; x-ray of the human thorax; mountains, referring to his poem "The Alps" | Never issued (reserve series) |
| | | 1000 francs | 192 × 86 mm | Purple | Louis Agassiz; structure of the surface of a shellfish | Head, skeleton and fossil of a perch; structure of the scales of a perch; ammonite | Never issued (reserve series) |
These images are to scale at 0.7 pixel per millimetre (18 pixel per inch). For table standards, see the banknote specification table.

=== Eighth series ===
The eighth series of Swiss franc banknotes, designed by Jörg Zintzmeyer, entered circulation in 1995. They were withdrawn in 2021. It also marked a shift in denominations, as the 500 francs note was dropped in favour of the new 200 francs note.

Eight series (1995–1998) Designer: Jörg Zintzmeyer
| Image | | Value | Dimensions (mm) | Main colour | Description | | Issue | Withdrawn |
| Obverse | Reverse | Value | Dimensions (mm) | Main colour | Obverse | Reverse | Issue | Withdrawn |
|---|---|---|---|---|---|---|---|---|
| | | 10 francs | 74 × 126 | Yellow | Le Corbusier | Ground plan, government district of Chandigarh, India | 8 April 1995 | 30 April 2021 |
| | | 20 francs | 74 × 137 | Red | Arthur Honegger | Pacific 231 | 1 October 1994 | 30 April 2021 |
| | | 50 francs | 74 × 148 | Green | Sophie Taeuber-Arp | Tête Dada, 1919 | 3 October 1995 | 30 April 2021 |
| | | 100 francs | 74 × 159 | Blue | Alberto Giacometti | L'Homme qui marche I | 1 October 1998 | 30 April 2021 |
| | | 200 francs | 74 × 170 | Brown | Charles Ferdinand Ramuz | Lac de Derborence (Les Diablerets), Lavaux | 1 October 1997 | 30 April 2021 |
| | | 1000 francs | 74 × 181 | Purple | Jacob Burckhardt | Palazzo Strozzi, Florence | 1 April 1998 | 30 April 2021 |
For table standards, see the banknote specification table.

=== Ninth series ===
In 2005, the Swiss National Bank held a competition to determine the design of the next series of banknotes. The competition was won by Manuel Krebs, but his designs, which include depictions of blood cells and embryos, were met with sufficient opposition from the general public as to discourage the bank from going forward with them. As a result, the ninth series of Swiss franc banknotes was based on designs by second place finalist Manuela Pfrunder. The series was scheduled to be issued around 2010 but was delayed to 2015 due to technical problems in the production. The new 50-franc banknote was issued on 12 April 2016, followed by the 20-franc banknote on 17 May 2017, the 10-franc banknote on 18 October 2017, the 200-franc banknote on 22 August 2018, the 1,000-franc banknote on 13 March 2019 and the 100-franc banknote on 12 September 2019.

Ninth series (2016–2018) Designer: Manuela Pfrunder
| Image | | Value | Dimensions (mm) | Main colour | Description | | | Issue |
| Obverse | Reverse | Value | Dimensions (mm) | Main colour | Theme (Swiss characteristic) | Obverse (action) | Reverse (location and object) | Issue |
|---|---|---|---|---|---|---|---|---|
| | | 10 francs | 70 × 123 | Yellow | Time; Organisational talent | Hands conducting with a baton; Globe: around the IDL, End of Day (Pacific Ocean); Time zones; Background: Clock faces; Security strip: Swiss rail network and its longest tunnels | Lötschberg Base Tunnel rail tracks, reducing travel time; Watch's movement: symbolising strong organisational talent; Rail network lines | 18 October 2017 |
| | | 20 francs | 70 × 130 | Red | Light; Creativity | Hand with a prism and light; Globe: 4 hours earlier (Pacific Ocean, Americas); constellations; Background: Kaleidoscope; Security strip: Night-time light emissions; distances in light seconds between Earth and celestial bodies | Light beaming a movie to a large outdoor screen on the Piazza Grande in Locarno during the Locarno Film Festival; Butterfly: Light reveals the wings' colour; Iris lines | 17 May 2017 |
| | | 50 francs | 70 × 137 | Green | Wind; Wealth of experiences | Hand holding a dandelion; pappi carried by the wind; Globe: another 4 hours earlier (Africa, Americas); wind directions; Background: Wind flow arrows; Security strip: Swiss Alps and four-thousand-metre peaks list | Wind streaming around the Swiss Alps's glaciated mountain peaks; Paraglider: the wind keeping it aloft; Contour lines: evokes the Swiss varied landscapes | 12 April 2016 |
| | | 100 francs | 70 × 144 | Blue | Water; Humanitarian tradition | Hands holding, providing water; Globe: another 4 hours earlier (Europe, Africa); isobars and contour lines; Security strip: Switzerland's rivers and its longest rivers | Water flowing alongside a mountain side in Valais; German: Suonen/French: des bisses: irrigation channels | 12 September 2019 |
| | | 200 francs | 70 × 151 | Brown | Matter; Scientific expertise | Hand pointing to the three dimensions (right-hand rule); Globe: another 4 hours earlier (Africa, Eurasia); Late Cretaceous period land masses; Security strip: Swiss geological ages map; timeline of the universe's formation stages | Signals from a particle collision in a detector at the CERN Large Hadron Collider in Geneva; Particle collision map | 22 August 2018 |
| | | 1000 francs | 70 × 158 | Purple | Language; Communicative flair | Handshake; Globe: another 4 hours earlier, Start of Day (Eastern Asia, Australia); IPA letters; Security strip: Map of the Swiss language regions; list of Swiss cantons | Holding speeches in different languages in the Swiss parliament during the Federal Assembly at Bern; Relation graph | 13 March 2019 |
For table standards, see the banknote specification table.

=== Tenth series ===
In October 2024, the Swiss National Bank announced that it was starting the development of the tenth series of Swiss banknotes, focusing on the theme "Switzerland and its altitudes". After a design competition, the bank announced in March 2026 that the new series will be designed by the Lausanne-based design agency Emphase, headed by Fabienne Kilchör and Sébastien Fasel. The new banknotes are expected to be issued after 2030.

Tenth series (after 2030) Designer: Emphase (Fabienne Kilchör and Sébastien Fasel)
| Value | Main colour | Description | | | | Issue |
| Value | Main colour | Theme | Sub-theme / Altitude range | Obverse / Motif | Key focus | Issue |
|---|---|---|---|---|---|---|
| 10 francs | Yellow | Switzerland and its altitudes | Lowlands / Below 600 m | Topography, settlements, and life in the lowlands | Human presence and infrastructure | After 2030 |
| 20 francs | Red | Switzerland and its altitudes | Midland / 600 m – 1,000 m | Hills, agriculture, and cultural landscapes | Cultural and natural diversity | After 2030 |
| 50 francs | Green | Switzerland and its altitudes | Pre-Alps / 1,000 m – 1,800 m | Forests, pastures, and mountain transition zones | Living space and biodiversity | After 2030 |
| 100 francs | Blue | Switzerland and its altitudes | Alps / 1,800 m – 2,500 m | High-altitude alpine regions and waters | Water sources and alpine environment | After 2030 |
| 200 francs | Brown | Switzerland and its altitudes | High Alps / 2,500 m – 3,500 m | Rocks, glaciers, and extreme climate | Geology and high-mountain nature | After 2030 |
| 1,000 francs | Purple | Switzerland and its altitudes | High peaks / Above 3,500 m | Summit regions and expansive views | Horizons and cosmic perspectives | After 2030 |
For table standards, see the banknote specification table.

== Security and counterfeiting ==
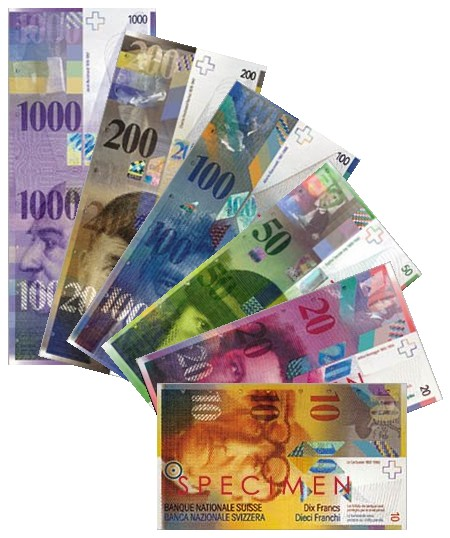
The eighth banknote series possesses at least eighteen security features.

According to the 2008 edition of Guinness World Records, the eighth series of Swiss franc notes is the most secure in the world with up to 18 security features including a tilting digit, which can only be seen from an unusual angle, a UV digit that can only be seen under ultraviolet light and micro text. According to their respective central banks, the rate of counterfeited banknotes as of 2011 was about 1 in 100,000 for the Swiss franc, 1 in 20,000 for the euro, 1 in 10,000 for the United States dollar and 1 in 3,333 for the pound sterling.

== See also ==
- Coins of the Swiss franc
- Vreneli
- Hybrid paper-polymer banknote

== Bibliography ==
- Michel de Rivaz, The Swiss banknote: 1907–1997, Genoud, 1997 (ISBN 2-88100-080-0).
- Albert Meier, Monnaies – Billets de Banque. Suisse – Liechtenstein 1798–1995, Hünibach, 1996.
