= International Convention for the Suppression of Counterfeiting Currency =

1929 multilateral treaty

The International Convention for the Suppression of Counterfeiting Currency (French: Convention internationale pour la répression du faux monnayage) is a 1929 League of Nations treaty whereby states agree to criminalize acts of currency counterfeiting. It remains the principal international agreement on currency counterfeiting.

== Background ==
The post-war years were marked by a meteoric rise of money counterfeiting across Europe. Hyperinflation plagued many European currencies significantly increasing the profitability of forging the relatively stable United States dollar and Dutch guilder. At the same time political tensions hindered international police collaboration on the issue. Vienna became a hub of the clandestine trade. Its long established trade connections, the use of easily forgeable overprinted banknotes by the successor states of Austria-Hungary and breakdown of police collaboration between said states led to the creation of large criminal syndicates dedicated to counterfeiting. In Hungary, nationalist groups began forging the currencies of neighboring countries with the tacit support of the Hungarian state. In 1921, a group of Hungarians led by Turkologist Gyula Mészáros set up a press in the town of Metzelsdorf outside Graz, Austria. The group managed to produce and put into circulation 60,000 500-Czechoslovak koruna banknotes. Most of the forgers were arrested in July 1921, by that time the Czechoslovak government was forced to pull the entire sokol note series out of circulation, undermining the credibility of its currency reforms.

It was estimated that approximately 1 million $ worth of counterfeit currency was put into circulation each year in the middle of the 1920s. The sokol affair prompted Czechoslovak police to establish police unit specializing in countering money counterfeiting in Prague while also seeking cooperation with neighboring countries. In the Netherlands, K.H. Broekhoff founded the Dutch Counterfeit Money Center. Police authorities began closely collaborating with the issuing banks while criminal investigations of forgeries from different parts of the country were treated as a single case. In 1923, Vienna Chief of Police Johannes Schober convened the International Police Congress in Vienna which gave birth to the International Criminal Police Commission (ICPC). The ICPC promoted the internationalization of policing collating and disseminating information on crime between its members.

Another Hungarian nationalist counterfeiting plot known as the Franc affair was uncovered in December 1925. The plotters sought to intentionally damage the French economy through the large scale production of counterfeit French francs. In the aftermath of the affair France turned its attention to combating international counterfeiting. French lawmakers revised a February 1926 Czechoslovak proposal to create an international police organization whose members would fight money counterfeiting. French Prime Minister Aristide Briand's proposal called for the unification anti-counterfeiting laws, police and judicial cooperation and the creation of national anti-counterfeiting centers in each signatory. The proposal was heralded by Romanian legal expert Vespasian Pella who shaped it into the draft of the International Convention for the Suppression of Counterfeiting Currency.

== Convention ==
States that ratify the Convention agree to criminalize the creation, use, and exportation or importation of counterfeit currency. Under the agreement, no distinction is to be made as to what currency is the subject of the crime. Under the treaty, currency counterfeiting is an extraditable offense. States also agree to establish a central office that will forward to all other state parties cancelled specimens of their state's currency and notify the other states when changes to their currency are implemented.

The convention was concluded in Geneva on 20 April 1929 and entered into force on 22 February 1931.

== Aftermath ==
The convention facilitated ICPC's recognition by the League of Nations and formalized its efforts to fight international crime.

As of March 2016, it has 83 state parties and remains the primary international agreement on currency counterfeiting. It was most recently ratified by Serbia in March 2016. China, India, Japan, and the United States are among the states that have signed the treaty but have not ratified it.
