= Manuela Pfrunder =

Swiss graphic designer (born 1979)

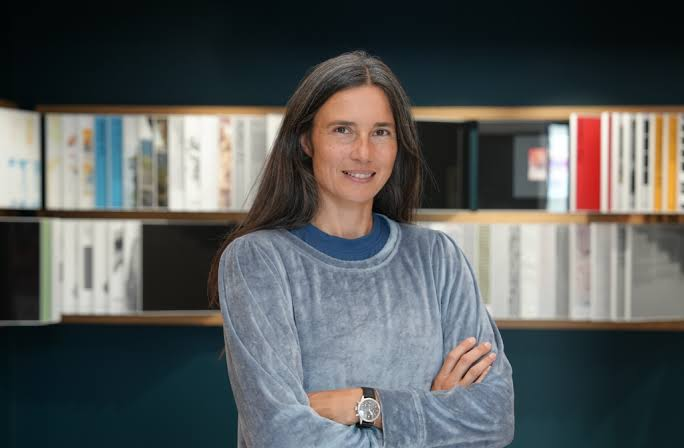
A photograph of Manuela Pfrunder

Manuela Pfrunder (born 25 March 1979 in Lucerne, Switzerland) is a Swiss graphic designer. She was chosen by the Swiss National Bank to design the ninth series of Swiss franc banknotes.

Pfrunder studied graphic design in Lucerne and worked as a designer in New York, Bern, and Bath. For her project Die Fortsetzung der Schöpfung (The continuation of Creation), she was awarded the Swiss Design Award in 2001.

In 2005, she submitted designs for the Swiss National Bank's banknote design competition. Her designs, focusing on Switzerland as a tourist destination, were awarded second place. In February 2007, the National Bank chose her submission as the basis of the new banknotes series, which was scheduled to be issued – in a much reworked design – from 2016 to 2018.
