= Franc affair =

Plot by Hungarian nationalists to forge French bank notes

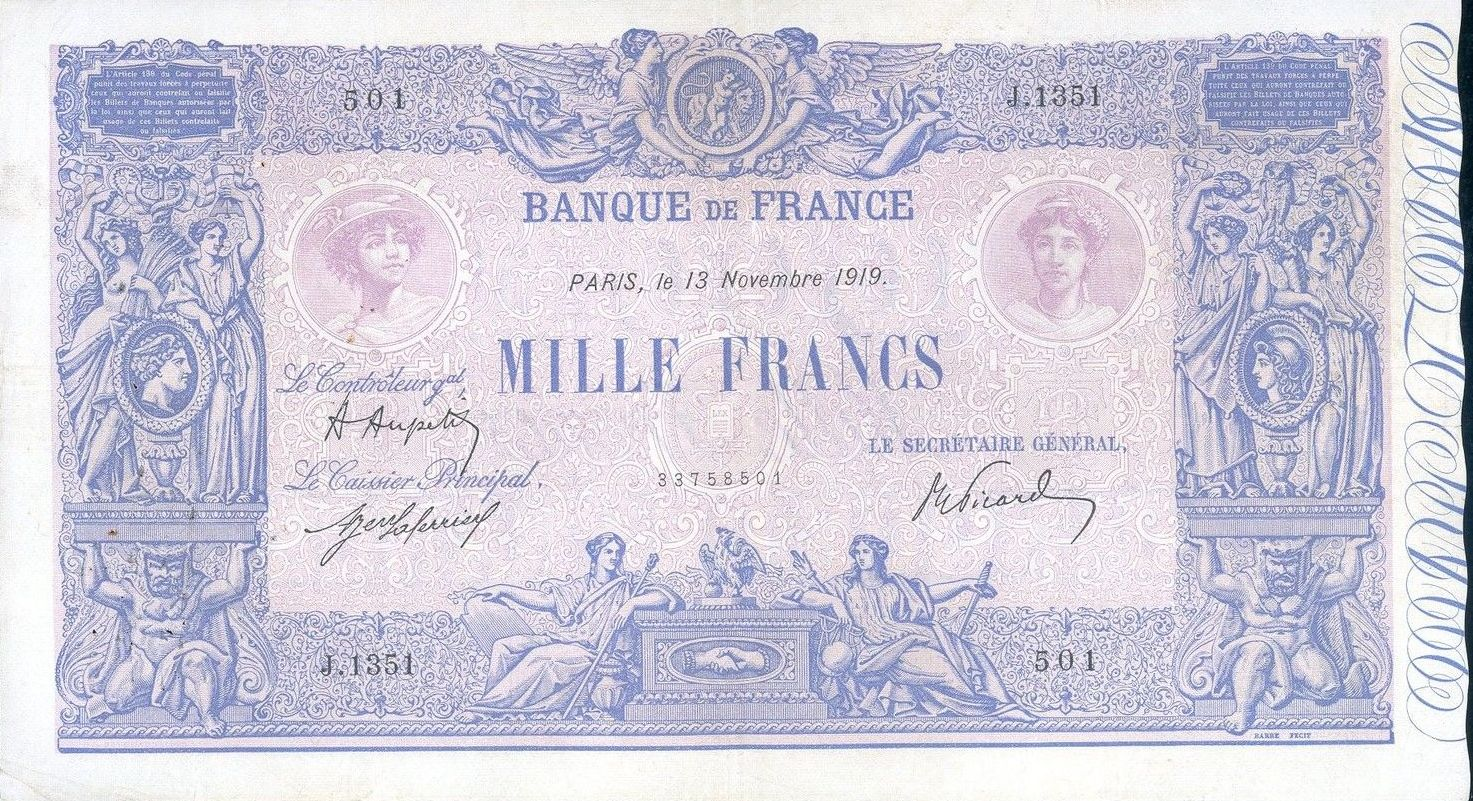
Obverse of the 1919 1000 franc banknote targeted by the counterfeiters

The Franc affair (Hungarian: frankhamisítási botrány) was a plot by Hungarian nationalists to forge French bank notes. In the aftermath of World War I, Hungary lost a large part of its territory and population in a series of treaties its people considered unjust. This led many Hungarians to turn towards nationalism and revanchism. In 1922, Prince Lajos Windischgraetz was approached by Gyula Mészáros who presented him with a plan to counterfeit the French franc. Windischgraetz sought to damage the French economy while simultaneously raising funds for an internal coup in Hungary and irredentist activities. The plan came to halt when the notes produced by Mészáros were judged to be too primitive. In the summer of 1923, Windischgraetz met with German nationalist and retired Prussian Army General Erich Ludendorff who prompted him to utilize the forging equipment left from a similar unrealized German conspiracy.

The plot received widespread support in Hungarian nationalist circles including the patronage of high-ranking military and civilian officials. By September 1925, the plotters managed to produce 25,000 to 35,000 forged 1,000 franc banknotes. The conspirators began disseminating the banknotes in the Netherlands in December 1925, but were caught almost immediately. Twenty-four of the conspirators were tried in Budapest in May 1926. Most received light sentences in what is believed to have been a deliberate cover up by Hungarian Prime Minister István Bethlen. The affair facilitated the adoption of the International Convention for the Suppression of Counterfeiting Currency in April 1929 and formalized the role of the International Criminal Police Commission.

== Background ==
=== Political developments in Hungary ===
Following the conclusion of the First World War, the victorious Entente Powers began deliberating on the future of the defeated Central Powers. Austro-Hungarian diplomats struggled to advance their positions during negotiations as they lacked diplomatic missions in Entente capitals. At the same time, emigrants from the kingdom's nationalities created influential lobbying groups which pushed for self-determination for ethnic minorities. The efforts of Czech politician Edvard Beneš and British political activist Robert Seton-Watson, helped turn the opinion of British, French and American political elites in favor of the partition of Austria-Hungary. In late October 1918, the First Hungarian Republic declared independence.

The Entente and in particular, French prime minister Georges Clemenceau, progressively hardened their stance against Hungary, in favor of the Kingdom of Romania, the Kingdom of Serbs, Croats and Slovenes and the First Czechoslovak Republic. In order to both fulfill past promises and gain their support for the Allied intervention in the Russian Civil War. Its territory was restricted as result of the November 1918 Armistice of Belgrade and the March 1919 Vix Note. The latter led to the resignation of Count Mihály Károlyi's government and the subsequent establishment of the Hungarian Soviet Republic on 21 March. The new communist government initiated a purge of its political opponents which later came to be known as the Red Terror, all while fighting against Romania and Czechoslovakia on multiple fronts. The Romanian army achieved a decisive victory on 1 August, occupying and pillaging Budapest. The Romanians withdrew from the capital on 15 November, paving the way for Admiral Miklós Horthy's national army to seize control. Horthy's army launched its own purge of perceived supporters of the previous government. The Hungarian throne was proclaimed vacant after King Charles I of Austria fled to Switzerland. The national army then pressured the national assembly into electing Horthy as the regent of the Kingdom of Hungary on 1 March 1920.

Under those chaotic circumstances Horthy signed the Treaty of Trianon on 4 June 1920, formally ending the state of war between Hungary and the Entente. The Treaty of Trianon marked the end of historical Hungary, as it resulted in the loss of lands which were inhabited by 3.5 million ethnic Hungarians; reducing Hungary to 93,000 square kilometres (36,000 sq mi). The Hungarian population perceived the treaty as fundamentally unjust driving it towards nationalism, irredentism and revanchism. Post-war Hungary suffered economic hardship and was isolated diplomatically.

=== Money forgery ===
The post-war years were marked by a meteoric rise of money counterfeiting across Europe. Hyperinflation plagued many European currencies significantly increasing the profitability of forging the relatively stable United States dollar and Dutch guilder. At the same time political tensions hindered international police collaboration on the issue. Vienna became a hub of the clandestine trade. Its long‐established trade connections, the use of easily forgeable overprinted banknotes by the successor states of Austria-Hungary and the breakdown of police collaboration between said states led to the creation of large criminal syndicates dedicated to counterfeiting. In Hungary, nationalist groups began forging the currencies of neighboring countries with the tacit support of the Hungarian state. In 1921, a group of Hungarians led by Turkologist Gyula Mészáros set up a press in the town of Metzelsdorf outside Graz, Austria. The group managed to produce and put into circulation 60,000 500-Czechoslovak koruna banknotes. Most of the forgers were arrested in July 1921, by that time the Czechoslovak government was forced to pull the entire sokol note series out of circulation, undermining the credibility of its currency reforms.

It was estimated that approximately 1 million United States dollars' worth of counterfeit currency was put into circulation each year in the middle of the 1920s. The sokol affair prompted Czechoslovak police to establish a police unit specializing in countering money counterfeiting in Prague while also seeking cooperation with neighboring countries. In the Netherlands, K.H. Broekhoff founded the Dutch Counterfeit Money Center. Police authorities began closely collaborating with the issuing banks while criminal investigations of forgeries from different parts of the country were treated as a single case. In 1923, Vienna Chief of Police Johannes Schober convened the International Police Congress in Vienna which gave birth to the International Criminal Police Commission (ICPC). The ICPC promoted the internationalization of policing, collating and disseminating information on crime between its members.

== Plot ==
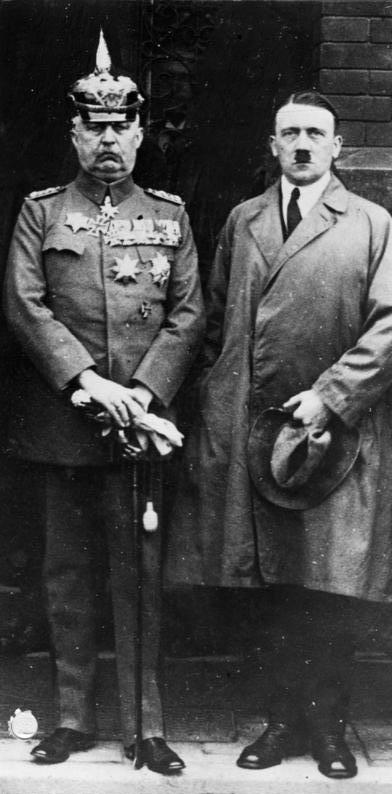
Erich Ludendorff and Adolf Hitler

=== Preparation ===
Upon the death of King Charles I in 1922, his close associate Prince Lajos Windischgraetz returned to Hungary from Switzerland. During his brief spell as Hungarian Minister of Food Supply in 1918, he had misappropriated a large sum of money which he began using to fund Hungarian nationalist organizations. Windischgraetz met with Prime Minister István Bethlen, arguing in favor of uniting the various Hungarian irredentist organizations into a united front. Mészáros whose case had been dismissed by an Austrian court without going to trial, approached Windischgraetz with a plan to counterfeit the French franc. Windischgraetz agreed to provide funding for the operation with Imre Nádosy, the Chief Captain of National Police joining in the same year. The plan was put to a halt when Mészáros immigrated to Turkey and Windischgraetz realized that it relied on crude printing technology.

In the summer of 1923, Windischgraetz came into contact with prominent German nationalists Erich Ludendorff and Adolf Hitler with Bethlen's tacit approval. German nationalists shared Hungary's animosity towards France and were eager to collaborate on clandestine operations. It was at that point that Ludendorff (a retired Prussian Army General) revealed to Windischgraetz that German industrialists from the French‐occupied Ruhr had financed a plot to counterfeit French francs. While the technical aspect of the plot had been nearly completed, it had to be abandoned due to the warming of Franco-German relations in the prelude to the Locarno Treaties. Ludendorff then offered Windischgraetz to execute the plot with the use of the left‐over equipment. German engraver Arthur Schulze was sent to Budapest, he in turn helped procure printing machines in Leipzig. In the meantime, Windischgraetz's secretary Dezsö Rába arranged for 9,000 pounds (4,100 kg) of special paper to be shipped from Cologne. The materials were transported aboard tugboats navigating the Danube River and in sealed railroad cars from Bavaria.

Windischgraetz provided 1,300 dollars for the operation while Postal Savings Bank director Gábor Baross gave 6,000 dollars in additional funds. Baross also advised the plotters on matters of distribution. In early 1924, the scheme received the approval of former Prime Minister Pál Teleki. Cartographic Institute technical expert Major György Gerő initiated his supervisor General Lajos Haits and the director of the institute, General Sándor Kurtz into the conspiracy. The printing press was then set up in the institute's cellar and dynamite was planted in parts of the building in order to destroy any evidence of the operation in case of a raid by the Military Inter-Allied Commission of Control. Gerő then helped Schulze resolve the final technical problems with producing the plates for the 1,000 franc banknote.

Printing began in either 1924 or April 1925, by the summer of 1925 a lack of funds limited production to less than a thousand banknotes per day. The initial goal of producing 100 million dollars' worth of counterfeits had to be scaled down to 100,000 banknotes worth 3.2 million dollars. The initial goal of destroying the French economy had to be abandoned. Participants of the plot offered conflicting testimonies regarding its other goals including conducting an invasion of Transylvania and funding a referendum in Slovakia. According to author Murray Bloom, the proceeds were to fund a coup that aimed to bring Archduke Albrecht to the Hungarian throne on Christmas Day 1925. When Baross showed specimens of the forgery to other Hungarian bank executives they decried their poor quality. Baross then discussed the issue with Bethlen who urged him not to disseminate the banknotes within Hungary. By September 1925, between 25,000 and 35,000 forged banknotes had been produced.

The conspirators met at the house of Catholic Chief Chaplain of the Hungarian Army István Zadravecz who blessed the banknotes and led an oath‐swearing ceremony. Colonel Arisztid Jankovich, the brother‐in‐law of the Minister of Defense, Count Károly Csáky, was to act as the main distributor of the money. The notes were stored in Zadravecz's house and in the Windischgraetz family castle in Sarostpak near Tokaj. Nádosy provided the conspirators with passports, Jankovich's bearing a diplomatic courier stamp. He then transported the money to the Hungarian Foreign Ministry where it was placed into diplomatic pouches and shipped abroad. Gaspar Kovács, Windischgraetz's personal valet had previously sent six of the 1,000 franc notes to a personal friend, a Dutch bank cashier named Severing, asking him to convert them to Dutch guilders. After Severing failed to detect the forgery, Windischgraetz ordered twelve distributors to depart for abroad. Private banks in the capitals of the Netherlands, Sweden, Belgium and Italy were to be successively targeted. The distributors were to transfer the genuine money to the respective Hungarian embassies which would then ship it in diplomatic pouches to the Cartographic Institute.

=== Discovery ===
The distributors departed Budapest on 10 December 1925. On 13 December, Jankovich reached the Dutch border by train. Upon inspecting his passport Dutch customs officials noticed that it lacked a visa. They opened Jankovich's luggage but did not dare to open the packages it contained because they bore diplomatic seals. He was ordered to secure a visa in The Hague by the end of the next day. This incident threatened to derail his plans as he was originally supposed to hand over the parcel addressed to the Hungarian Minister in The Hague to two other conspirators and then depart for Stockholm the following day. Upon arriving at the Amsterdam Centraal station he booked a room at a nearby hotel. There he opened the parcel and took out twenty-five forged 1,000 franc notes and went to the Amsterdam Bourse. György Marsovszky and György Mankowicz met Jankovich behind the Bourse at 2 p.m., the two were staying at another hotel and were using fake names and forged Romanian passports. While handing them the notes, two fell down and Jankovich picked them up and placed them into his wallet.

Having completed his assignment Jankovich traveled to The Hague early in the following day. He secured a visa at the passport office without incident and then went to a private bank to exchange one of the four 1,000 franc notes in his wallet (two being genuine and two being counterfeits). The bank's teller had stepped away from his post to respond to a phone call, so Jankovich was served by the bank's manager, a local expert in money forgery. It remains unknown whether Jankovich handed a counterfeit note on purpose or by accident, but the manager immediately became suspicious and ordered the bank's detective to follow him. The detective followed Jankovich to a local luxury hotel, alerting the bank and the police about his whereabouts. Two police detectives and the bank's manager entered Jankovich's suite questioning him about the incident. Jankovich professed his innocence declaring that he was a courier of the Hungarian Ministry of Foreign Affairs and therefore possessed diplomatic immunity. At that point one of the detectives noticed a 1,000 franc note protruding from under the bed, upon examining it he declared it to be a counterfeit. The detectives then opened a trunk in the corner of the room finding it to be stuffed with packets of money. Jankovich demanded to be taken to the Hungarian embassy.

Jankovich was escorted to the embassy where he was met by the Hungarian consul. Visibly irritated, Jankovich demanded to speak with the ambassador in person, declaring that he was carrying out a special mission on behalf of the Hungarian police. The Dutch detectives then handed over the case to the Ministry of Foreign Affairs. Unaware of the plot, the ambassador sent a telegram to Budapest on 22 January expressing doubts about the credibility of Jankovich's statement. Dutch police captured Marsovszky and Mankowicz in The Hague after finding a note with their hotel addresses in Jankovich's room, confiscating the entire shipment of forged money. The three plotters initially refused to cooperate with the investigation, however the Bank of France and Sûreté Générale contacted the investigators and presented them with the six counterfeit notes previously sent by Kovács. When the investigators revealed Kovács' ties to Windischgraetz, the three arrested plotters made a full confession. Dutch Police Chief K.H. Broekhoff telegraphed the confessions to Paris and Budapest and sent descriptions of the forged banknotes to other members of the ICPC. Forty Sûreté detectives were dispatched to Vienna and Budapest, arriving on 28 December. French Prime Minister Aristide Briand initially sought to strengthen his country's political influence in central Europe by politicizing the affair. Pushing for Bethlen's removal from power and his replacement by a more liberal politician.

The plotters began destroying the printing presses, but they forgot to get rid of the stocks of banknote paper which were later discovered by the investigators. Windischgraetz's secretary Rába sent all the money couriers abroad a telegram with the message "AUNT ILL COME HOME". By that time another courier Edmund von Olchvary, was tracked to Copenhagen and then arrested in Hamburg on 1 January 1926. The following day, Rába and Kovács were arrested. Reports of the case were widely discussed in the Dutch and French press, as well as Hungarian papers sympathetic to the opposition. Nádosy admitted his involvement in the operation to the Hungarian Justice and Interior Ministers. On 4 January, Windischgraetz and Nádosy were detained, the latter was also suspended from his position. The involvement of the Cartographic Institute in the plot prompted an appointment of a royal Hungarian persecutor to supervise the case. The Hungarian persecutor declared the case an internal affair and stopped collaborating with the French. In late January, French investigators leaked incriminating details about Bethlen's involvement in the plot to the press. On 20 January 1926, the Hungarian parliament approved the creation of a commission to investigate the government's involvement in the affair. The arrests of Haits, Kurtz and many other conspirators followed. Schulze was arrested on 16 February with the help of the German police. He died a month later under mysterious circumstances, allegedly due to being poisoned. Austrian police also assisted in the investigation.

== Aftermath ==
=== Trials ===
The trial of the 24 conspirators opened in Budapest on 7 May 1926. They attracted considerable attention from the press, including American journalists Dorothy Thompson and Hubert Renfro Knickerbocker. The French government was represented by Hungarian lawyer Paul de Auer. De Auer argued that while the damage inflicted to the French economy had the plot succeeded would have been minimal, it would have caused considerable harm to the country's reputation. The prosecution presented a general outline of the plot which was notable for its omissions regarding the role played by Bethlen and Teleki. Teleki claimed that he became aware of the plot in 1922, but stopped being involved after receiving a report from Gerő which claimed that the project was not viable. Bethlen likewise denied knowing anything concrete about the plot. Evidence presented at the trial pointed to Teleki's role as an intermediary between the government and the plotters, while Bethlen was most likely aware of the plot but allowed it to proceed. Windischgraetz revealed the plot's goals, he nevertheless refused to disclose the identities of other plotters. Several Hungarian parliament deputies testified in his defense, arguing that his actions were patriotic in nature. Rába's initial testimony implicated Bethlen, several of his political allies and a number of German nationals. However, he subsequently withdrew the most controversial parts of his initial testimony. Captain György Hir's testimony also implicated Bethlen, Hir died under mysterious circumstances two weeks before the conclusion of the trial.

On 26 May 1926, the verdicts were rendered. Two of the defendants were acquitted. Windischgraetz was given four years in prison, Nádosy was given four years of hard labor and a fine of 2,000 dollars. Gerő received two years in prison, Rába one and a half years, Haits and Kurtz received one year in prison each. Zadravecz was forced to resign from his position and spent two years in an Austrian monastery as punishment. The court ruled that the defendants were motivated by patriotism as an extenuating circumstance. Gerő and Rába's sentences were reduced to six months on appeal. Neither Bethlen, nor any member of his cabinet were charged; it is believed that Bethlen exercised direct control over the proceedings. Windischgraetz spent several weeks in prison, before being moved to a luxurious sanatorium. A national petition for Windischgraetz to be pardoned received 100,000 signatures. Windischgraetz and Nádosy were pardoned by Horthy the following year. The plotters captured abroad were tried separately in the countries where they were captured. Jankovich, Marsovszky and Mankowicz were tried in The Hague, while von Olchvary was tried in Hamburg. All receiving light sentences.

=== Impact ===
Facing considerable public pressure Bethlen offered his resignation to Horthy, who refused to accept it. Bethlen subsequently shuffled his cabinet by replacing Interior Minister Iván Rakovszky. The outcome of the trials increased Bethlen's popularity in Hungary.

The French Foreign Ministry saw Bethlen's exoneration in the Franc affair as a diplomatic defeat which emboldened nationalists in Hungary and Germany. When its attempt to push for the continuation of the League of Nations' economic oversight of Hungary failed, France turned its attention to combating international counterfeiting. French lawmakers revised a February 1926 Czechoslovak proposal to create an international police organization whose members would fight money counterfeiting. Briand's proposal called for the unification of anti-counterfeiting laws, police and judicial cooperation and the creation of national anti-counterfeiting centers within the borders of each signatory. The proposal was reviewed and later adopted by the League of Nations in the International Convention for the Suppression of Counterfeiting Currency in April 1929. The convention facilitated ICPC's recognition by the League of Nations and formalized its efforts to fight international crime.
