= Counterfeit money =

Imitation currency intended to defraud

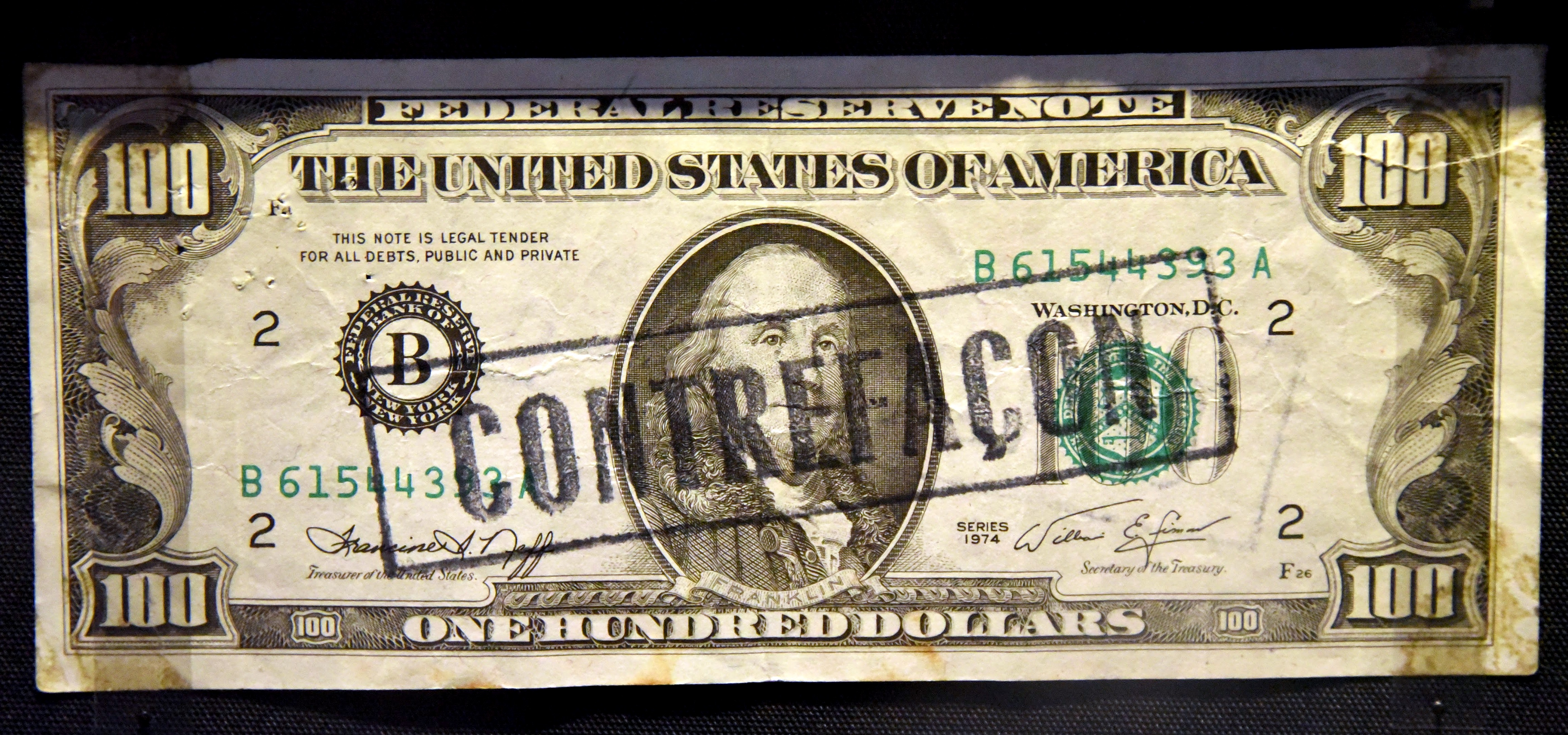
A counterfeit United States series 1974 $100 bill, over-stamped with "Contrefaçon" on both sides. On display at the British Museum, London.

Counterfeit money is currency produced outside the legal sanction of a government, usually in a deliberate attempt to imitate currency and to deceive its recipient. Counterfeit money is a form of fraud or forgery, and is illegal across the world. The business of counterfeiting money is one of the oldest forms of fraud: plated copies (known as Fourrées) have been found of Lydian coins, which are thought to be among the first Western coins.

With the introduction of paper money, counterfeiting as a whole has also changed. While early forms of money were more vulnerable to replication, now with modern tools counterfeiters have evolved into using things such as high-resolution scanners. Today, some of the most realistic counterfeit banknotes are called Superdollars because of their high quality and imitation of the real US dollar. There has been significant counterfeiting of Euro banknotes and coins since the launch of the currency in 2002, but considerably less than that of the US dollar.

Counterfeiting has numerous effects including reduction in the value of legitimate money; an increase in prices (inflation) as a result of an increase in money being circulated in the economy—an unauthorized artificial increase in the money supply; a decrease in the acceptability of paper money; and losses, when traders are not reimbursed for counterfeit money detected by banks, even if it is confiscated. Banks and law enforcement across the globe work to prevent and detect counterfeit currency, while also helping to educate the general public on how to identify fakes.

American 18th–19th century iron counterfeit coin mold for making fake Spanish milled dollars and U.S. half dollars

== History ==
Counterfeiting has occurred so frequently in history that it has been called "the world's second-oldest profession". Coinage of money began in the region of Lydia in Asia Minor around 600 BC. Before the introduction of paper money, the most prevalent method of counterfeiting involved mixing base metals with pure gold or silver. A common practice was to "shave" the edges of a coin. This is known as "clipping". Scraps of precious metals collected in this way could be melted down and even used to produce counterfeit coinage. A fourrée is an ancient type of counterfeit coin, in which counterfeiters plate a base-metal core with precious metal to resemble the solid-metal counterpart.

The Chinese government issued paper money from the 11th century AD. In the 13th century, wood from mulberry trees was used to make banknotes. To control access to the paper, guards were stationed around mulberry forests, while counterfeiters were punished by death.

In the Aztec Empire, the high value of cocoa beans utilized as a item of currency led to imitations with avocado pits hollowed and filled with wax, clay or amaranth seeds. This crime business even extended to forgery of Spanish silver pieces post-conquest as early as 1537.

Execution of counterfeiters in a sixteenth-century Russian miniature from the Illustrated Chronicle of Ivan the Terrible.

In the 13th century, Dante Alighieri wrote of Mastro Adamo as a counterfeiter of the Florentine fiorino, punished by burning at the stake. The English couple Thomas and Anne Rogers were convicted on 15 October 1690 for "Clipping 40 pieces of Silver". Thomas Rogers was hanged, drawn, and quartered while Anne Rogers was burnt alive. Evidence supplied by an informant led to the arrest of the last of the English coiners, "King" David Hartley, who was executed by hanging in 1770. The extreme forms of punishment were meted out because counterfeiting was regarded as a form of treason against the State or Crown rather than as a simple crime.

In the late-eighteenth and early-nineteenth centuries, Irish immigrants to London acquired a reputation for the production and spending (uttering) of counterfeit money, while locals were more likely to participate in the safer and more profitable forms of currency crime, which could take place behind locked doors. These include producing the false money and selling it wholesale.

In the British colonies in North America, Colonial paper currency printed by Benjamin Franklin and others often bore the phrase "to counterfeit is death". Counterfeiting in the early United States became so prevalent by the early-nineteenth century that contemporary accounts like those from author John Neal claimed that as much as half of the US currency in circulation was counterfeit. By the 1830s, American newspapers began listing instructions for identifying counterfeits. Because currency was issued by individual banks, approximately 5,400 types of counterfeit bills circulated in the US by the 1860s.

States have used counterfeiting as an element of warfare. The idea involves overflowing an enemy economy with fake money so that the real value of the money plummets. During the Seven Years' War of 1756 to 1763, Prussia disrupted the economy of the Polish–Lithuanian Commonwealth (ruled by King Augustus III, simultaneously Elector of Saxony) by minting counterfeit Polish coins. Great Britain used counterfeit money during the American Revolutionary War of 1775 to 1783 to reduce the value of the Continental Dollar. The counterfeiters working for the British became known as "shovers", presumably for the ability to "shove" the fake currency into circulation. Two of the most well-known shovers for the British during the Revolutionary War were David Farnsworth and John Blair. They were caught with 10,000 dollars in counterfeits when arrested. George Washington took a personal interest in their case and even called for them to be tortured to discover further information. They were eventually hanged for their crimes.

During the French Revolution, counterfeiting assignats (the currency France issued backed by confiscated Church lands) became a major effort by Britain. In an effort managed by William Playfair under the sponsorship of Secretary at War William Windham and Secretary of War Henry Dundas, the British produced paper for counterfeiting at Haughton Castle and several other mills. Although questioned as a rumor for many years, the British operation was confirmed in the 1990s when Northumberland antiquarians discovered paper molds with the French watermark at Haughton Castle. A mold with the watermark of Playfair's Original Security Bank was found nearby, confirming his role in the operation.

During the American Civil War, private interests on the Union side heavily counterfeited the Confederate States dollar, often without the sanction of the Union government in Washington. The Confederacy's access to modern printing technology was limited, while many Northern-made imitations were printed on high-quality banknote paper procured through extra-legal means. As a result, counterfeit Southern notes were often equal or even superior in quality compared to genuine Confederate money.

In 1834, counterfeit copper coins manufactured in the United States were seized from several ships with American flags in Brazil. The practice appeared to end after.

== Anti-counterfeiting measures ==
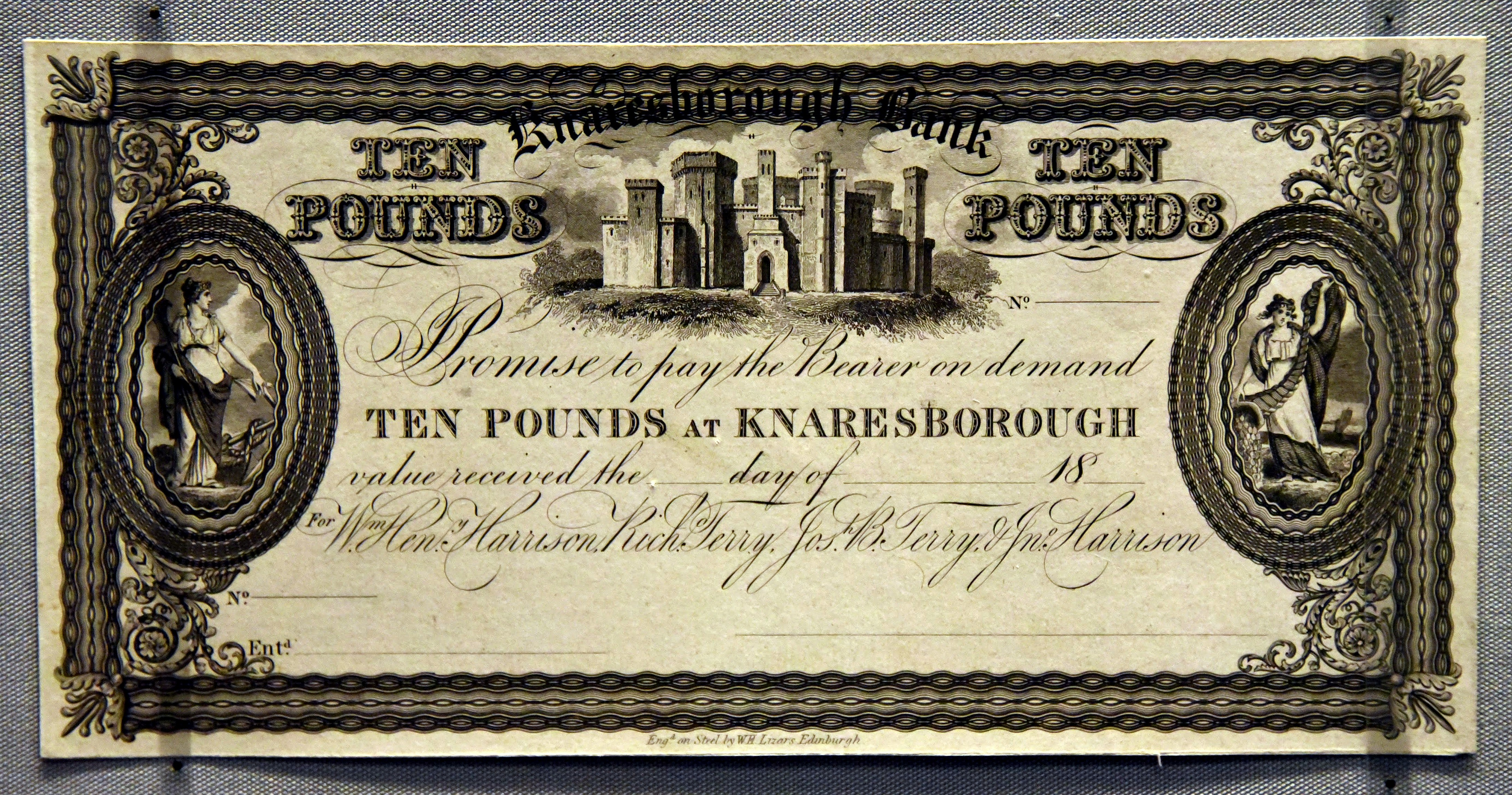
Proof banknote, 10 pounds, Knaresborough Old Bank, 1800s. Details, like the decorative frame and image of Knaresborough Castle as well as figures of Fortune and Plenty at left and right on this note, were intended to prevent forged notes from being made. On display at the British Museum in London.

Traditionally, anti-counterfeiting measures involved including fine detail with raised intaglio printing on bills which would allow non-experts to easily spot forgeries. On coins, milled or reeded (marked with parallel grooves) edges are used to show that none of the valuable metal has been scraped off. This detects the shaving or clipping (paring off) of the rim of the coin. However, it does not detect sweating, shaking coins in a bag, and collecting the resulting dust. Since this technique removes a smaller amount, it is primarily used on the most valuable coins, such as gold. In early paper money in Colonial North America, one creative means of deterring counterfeiters was to print the impression of a leaf in the bill. Since the patterns found in a leaf were unique and complex, they were nearly impossible to reproduce.

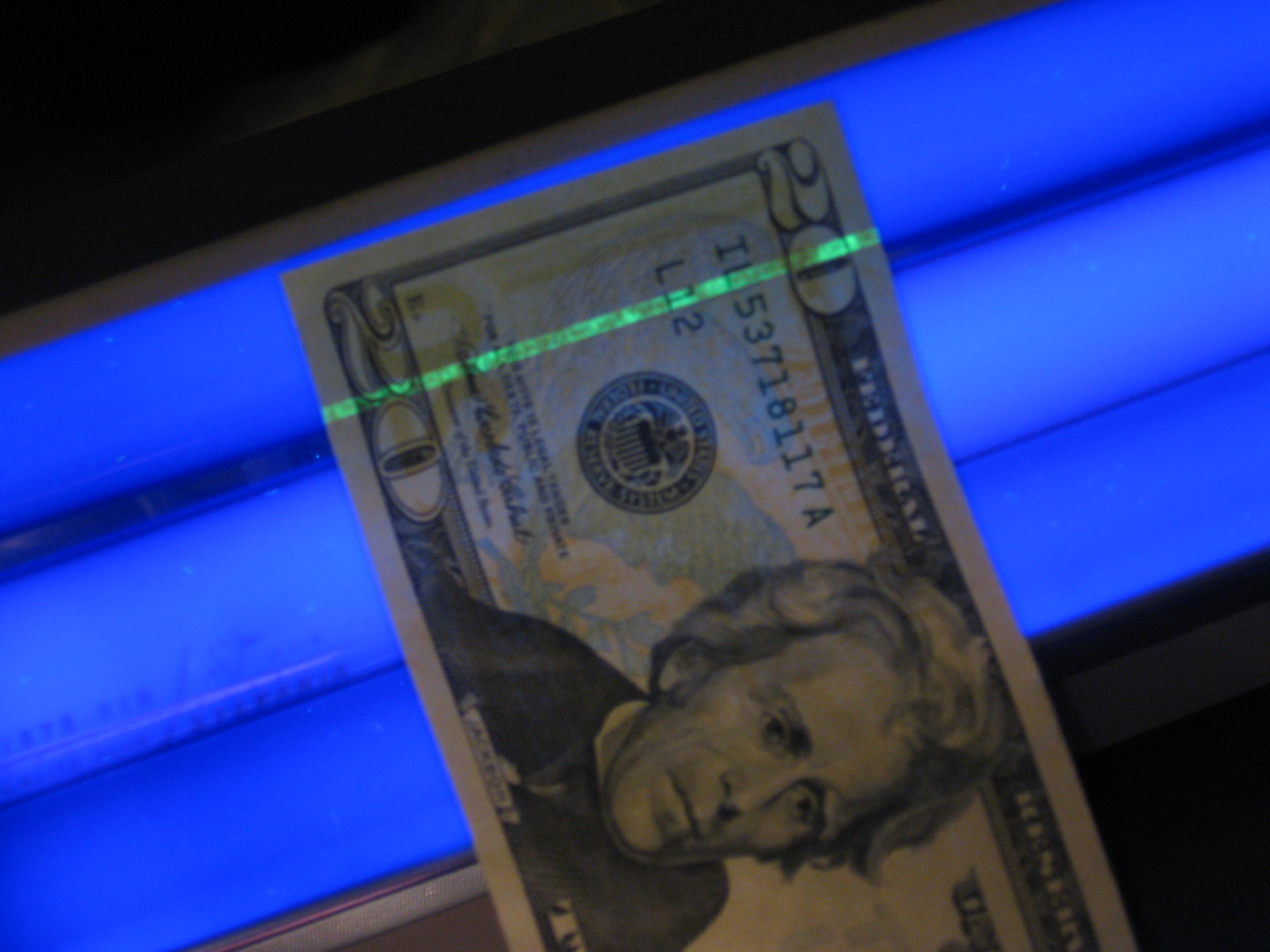
The security strip of a U.S. $20 bill glows under blacklight as a safeguard against counterfeiting.

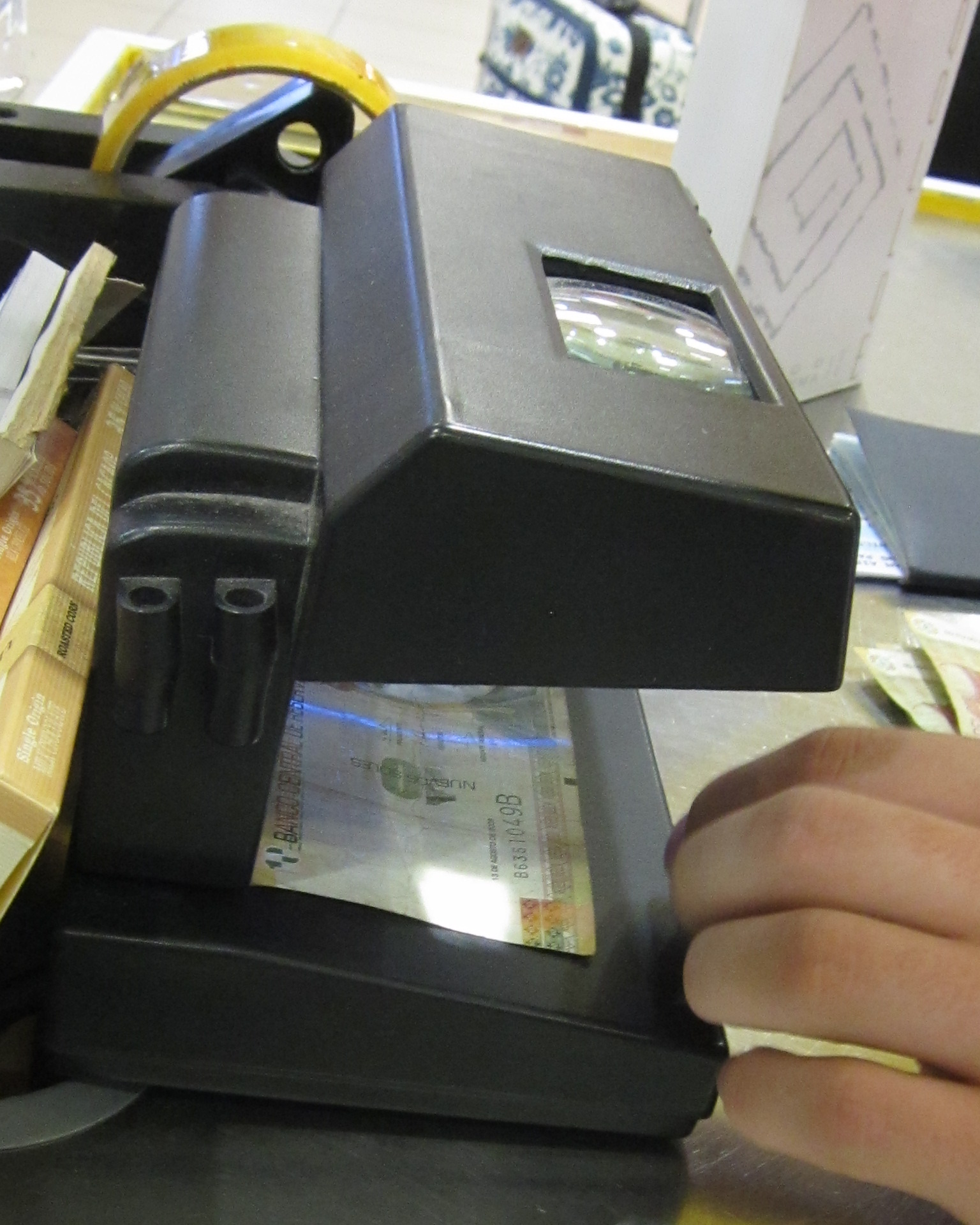
Bill inspection device in use in Peru, showing magnifying glass for inspection of detail and lit up security strip

In the late twentieth century, advances in computer and photocopier technology made it possible for people without sophisticated training to copy currency easily. In response, national engraving bureaus began to include new, more sophisticated anti-counterfeiting systems such as holograms, multi-colored bills, embedded devices such as strips, raised printing, microprinting, watermarks, and color-shifting inks whose colors changed depending on the angle of the light, and the use of design features such as the "EURion constellation" which disables modern photocopiers. Software programs such as Adobe Photoshop have been modified by their manufacturers to obstruct manipulation of scanned images of banknotes. There also exist patches to counteract these measures.

=== United States measures ===
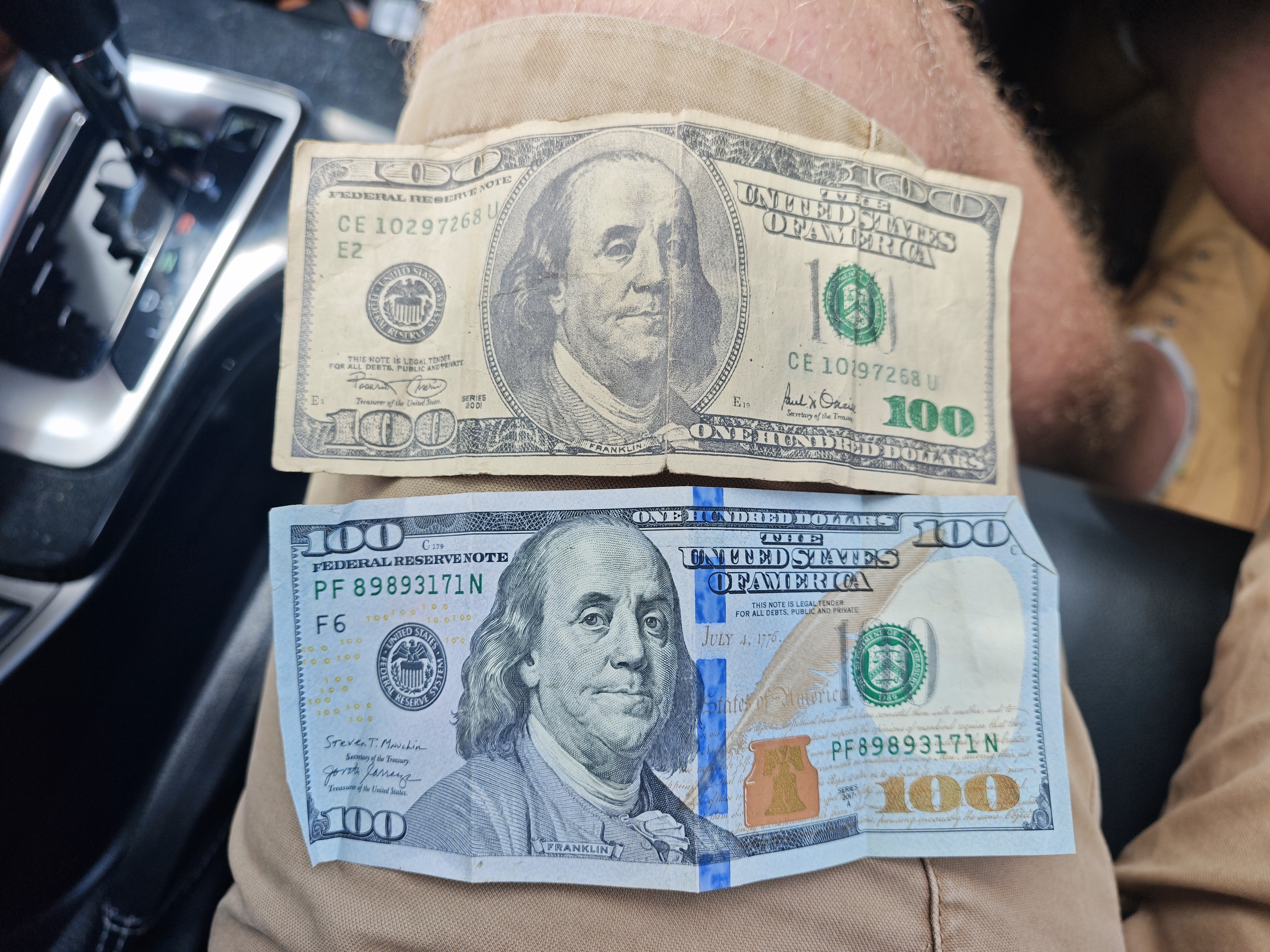
Fake 100 dollar bill compared to a real one.

In 2009, new tests were discovered that could be used on U.S. Federal Reserve Notes to ensure that the bills are authentic. These tests are done using intrinsic fluorescence lifetime. This allows for the detection of counterfeit money because of the significance in difference of fluorescence lifetime when compared to authentic money.

For U.S. currency, anti-counterfeiting milestones are as follows:

- 1990 - Microprinting and a security thread are introduced on U.S. currency
- 1996 - $100 bill gets a new design with a larger portrait
- 1997 - $50 bill gets a new design with a larger portrait
- 1998 - $20 bill gets a new design with a larger portrait
- 2000 - $10 bill and $5 bill get a new design with a larger portrait
- 2003 - $20 bill gets a new design with no oval around Andrew Jackson's portrait and more colors
- 2004 - $50 bill gets a new design with no oval around Ulysses S. Grant's portrait and more colors
- 2006 - $10 bill gets a new design with no oval around Alexander Hamilton's portrait and more colors
- 2008 - $5 bill gets a new design with no oval around Abraham Lincoln's portrait and more colors
- 2010 - $100 bill gets a new design with no oval around Benjamin Franklin's portrait and more colors; along with the inclusion of the new "3D security ribbon"

The redesigned $100 bill was unveiled on April 21, 2010, and the Federal Reserve Board was to begin issuing the new bill on February 10, 2011, but the release was delayed due to printing problems until October 2013.

The Treasury initially made no plans to redesign the $5 bill using colors but reversed its decision in 2006 after learning some counterfeiters were bleaching the ink off the bills and printing them as $100 bills; the new bills would enter circulation 2 years later. The new $10 bill (the design of which was revealed in late 2005) entered circulation on March 2, 2006. The $1 bill and $2 bill are seen by most counterfeiters as having too low a value to counterfeit, and so they have not been redesigned as frequently as higher denominations.

=== Irish measures ===
In the 1980s, counterfeiting in the Republic of Ireland twice resulted in sudden changes in official documents: in November 1984, the £1 postage stamp, also used on savings cards for paying television licences and telephone bills, was invalidated and replaced by another design at a few days' notice, because of widespread counterfeiting. Later, the £20 Central Bank of Ireland Series B banknote was rapidly replaced because of what the Finance Minister described as "the involuntary privatization of banknote printing".

=== Chinese measures ===
In the 1990s, the portrait of Chairman Mao Zedong was placed on the banknotes of the People's Republic of China to combat counterfeiting, as he was recognised better than the generic designs on the renminbi notes.

=== Australian measures ===
In 1988, the Reserve Bank of Australia released the world's first long-lasting and counterfeit-resistant polymer (plastic) banknotes with a special Bicentennial $10 note issue. After problems with this bill were discovered and addressed, in 1992, a problem-free $5 note was issued. In 1996, Australia became the first country to have a full series of circulating polymer banknotes. On 3 May 1999, the Reserve Bank of New Zealand started circulating polymer banknotes printed by Note Printing Australia Limited. The technology developed is now used in 24 countries. As of 2009, Note Printing Australia was printing polymer notes for 18 countries.

=== Swiss measures ===
The Swiss National Bank twice had a reserve series of notes (fourth and seventh series) for the Swiss franc which was held but not issued in case widespread counterfeiting were to take place; this was discontinued in the mid-1990's with the introduction of the eighth series of banknotes.

=== Japanese measures ===
Due to the discovery of a large number of counterfeit Series D banknotes at the end of 2004, the issuance of new Series D banknotes except ¥2000 was virtually suspended on January 17, 2005, and officially suspended on April 2, 2007. According to a news release from the National Police Agency, they seized 11,717 counterfeit Series D banknotes (excluding the ¥2000 denomination) in 2005.

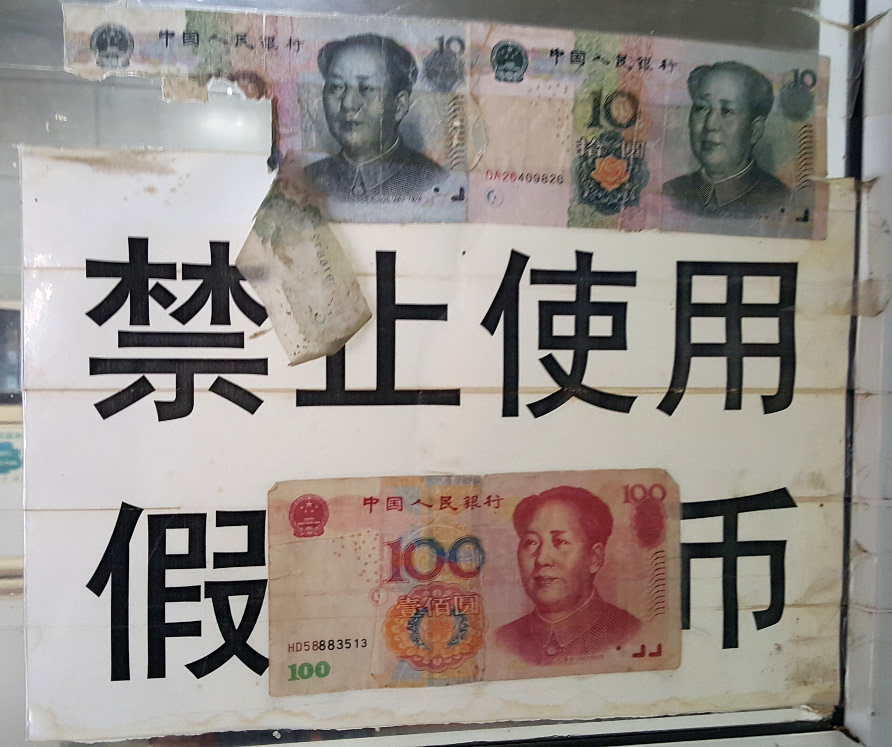
Anti-counterfeit money sign and examples of counterfeit notes received by a noodle shop in Kunming, Yunnan, China

== Instances ==
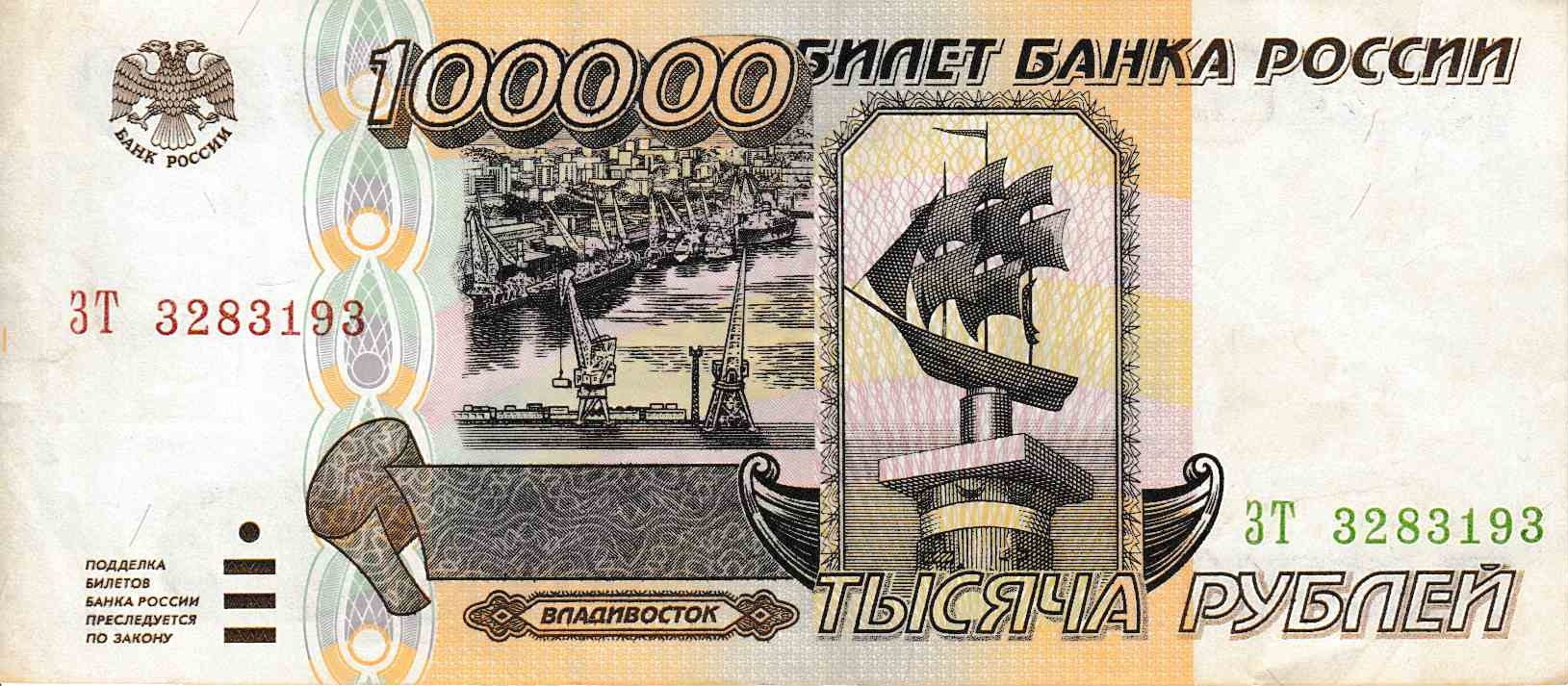
Crudely counterfeited 100,000 Russian ruble note, made by pasting two extra zeroes cut from a 1000-ruble note onto another. Note how the final zero up top overlaps the word Билет (banknote) at the top.

=== Portugal ===
A form of counterfeiting is the production of documents by legitimate printers in response to fraudulent instructions. An example of this is the Portuguese Bank Note Crisis of 1925, when the British banknote printers Waterlow and Sons produced Banco de Portugal notes equivalent in value to 0.88% of the Portuguese nominal Gross Domestic Product, with identical serial numbers to existing banknotes, in response to a fraud perpetrated by Alves dos Reis.

=== Iceland ===
In 1929 the issue of postage stamps celebrating the millennium of Iceland's parliament, the Althing, was compromised by the insertion of "1" on the print order, before the authorized value of stamps to be produced (see Postage stamps and postal history of Iceland).

=== France ===
In December 1925, a high-profile counterfeit scandal came to light, when three people were arrested in the Netherlands while attempting to disseminate forged French 1000-franc bills which had been produced in Hungary. Subsequent investigations uncovered evidence that the plot had received widespread support in Hungarian and German nationalist circles including the patronage of high-ranking military and civilian officials. Twenty-four of the conspirators were tried in Budapest in May 1926. Most received light sentences in what is believed to have been a deliberate cover up by Hungarian Prime Minister István Bethlen. The affair facilitated the adoption of the International Convention for the Suppression of Counterfeiting Currency in April 1929 and formalized the role of Interpol.

=== Germany ===
During World War II, the Nazis attempted to implement a similar plan (Operation Bernhard) against the Allies. The Nazis took Jewish artists to the Sachsenhausen concentration camp and forced them to forge British and American banknotes. The quality of the counterfeiting was very good, and it was almost impossible to distinguish between the real and fake bills. The Nazis were unable to carry out planned aerial drops of the counterfeits over Britain, so most notes were disposed of and not recovered until the 1950s.

=== United States ===
Today, some of the finest counterfeit banknotes are called Superdollars because of their high quality and likeness to the real US dollar. The sources of such supernotes are disputed, with North Korea being vocally accused by US authorities. The amount of counterfeit United States currency is estimated to be less than $3 per $10,000, with less than $3 per $100,000 being difficult to detect.

As a result of their rarity, gold and silver certificates have sometimes been erroneously flagged as counterfeits in the United States when they have, in fact, been genuine. Since these banknotes carry significant numismatic value and are sought after by collectors, counterfeit examples have surfaced on eBay via unscrupulous sellers.

=== Eurozone ===
There has been a rapid growth in the counterfeiting of euro banknotes and coins since the launch of the currency in 2002. In 2003, 551,287 fake euro notes and 26,191 bogus euro coins were removed from EU circulation. In 2004, French police seized fake €10 and €20 notes worth a total of around €1.8 million from two laboratories and estimated that 145,000 notes had already entered circulation.

In the early years of the 21st century, the United States Secret Service noted a substantial reduction in the quantity of forged U.S. currency as counterfeiters turned their attention towards the euro.

=== Australia ===
A batch of counterfeit A$50 and A$100 notes was released into the Australian city of Melbourne in July 2013. As of July 12, 2013, 40 reports had been made between the northern suburbs of Heidelberg and Epping. Police spokespersons explained to the public in media reports that the currency notes were printed on paper (Australia introduced polymer banknotes in 1988) and could be easily detected by scrunching up the note or tearing it. Additionally, the clear window within the notes was also an easy way to identify fake versions, as the "window appears to have been cut out with two clear plastic pieces stuck together with stars placed in the middle to replicate the Southern Cross". Police also revealed that fake notes had been seized in June 2013 in Melbourne's eastern and western suburbs. According to the Australian RBA figures, during 2014–15, the number of counterfeit $50 currency detected in circulation has more than doubled from the previous year, and more than 33,000 fake notes were removed from circulation. The officials believe this is likely a fraction of the number of fake currencies currently flooding through in Victoria and NSW states. On 31 May 2016, the ACT police have warned people to keep an eye out for fake $50 notes, which is circulating throughout Canberra in recent months. The officers have been called out to more than 35 businesses over the past two months in connection with counterfeit $50 notes. Australian Federal Police have charged two persons alleging to have produced $16,465 notes of counterfeit currency and charged them with various offences under the Crimes (Currency) Act 1981. The police said that while Australian notes are hard to counterfeit, featuring many security features, they nonetheless urged people to take a close look each time they spend cash.

== Notable counterfeiters ==
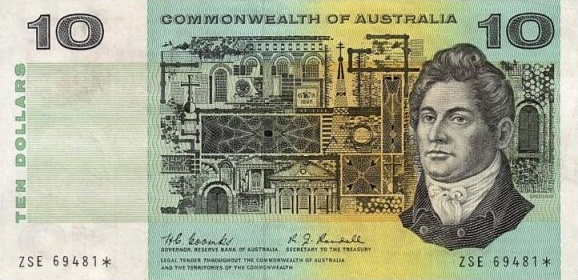
Francis Greenway on the first Australian 10 dollar note, perhaps the only convicted forger in the world depicted on a banknote

- Peter Alston was the late-18th-century and early-19th-century counterfeiter and river pirate, who is believed to be Little Harpe's associate and partner in the murder of notorious outlaw leader Samuel Mason in 1803
- Philip Alston was an 18th-century counterfeiter both before and after the American Revolution in Virginia and the Carolinas before the war, and later in Kentucky and Illinois afterward.
- Anatasios Arnaouti, a British counterfeiter of more than £2.5 million in fake money, was sentenced in 2005.
- Edward Bonney, an alleged counterfeiter in northern Indiana who escaped to Nauvoo, Illinois, was a bounty hunter and amateur detective who posed as a counterfeiter to apprehend the murderers of Colonel George Davenport and infiltrate the Midwestern Banditti of the Prairie.
- Abel Buell, an American colonialist and republican who went from altering five-pound note engraving plates to publishing the first map of the new United States created by an American.
- Mary Butterworth, a counterfeiter in colonial America.
- William Chaloner, a British counterfeiter, was convicted by Sir Isaac Newton and hanged on 16 March 1699.
- Mike DeBardeleben, a convicted kidnapper, rapist, and suspected serial killer, was sent to prison for counterfeiting the $20 bill.
- Alves dos Reis, who by the end of 1925 had managed to introduce escudo banknotes worth £1,007,963 at 1925 exchange rates into the Portuguese economy, which was equivalent to 0.88% of Portugal's nominal GDP at the time.
- John Duff was a counterfeiter, hunter, and soldier who served in George Rogers Clark's campaign to capture the Illinois Country, for the Patriot American side, during the Revolutionary War.
- Eric "Klipping" V, the king of Denmark (1259–1286). The king's nickname refers to "clipping" of the coin.
- David Farnsworth was a British Loyalist American counterfeiter and spy in the American Revolutionary War. He was hanged for his crimes after George Washington had taken a personal interest in his case.
- Francis Greenway was an English-born architect transported to Australia in 1814 as a convict for the crime of forgery, where he rose as a prominent planner of public buildings. He later posthumously became probably the only forger to be depicted on a banknote, the Australian $10.
- "King" David Hartley was the leader of the Cragg Vale Coiners of rural 18th-century England. Producing fake gold coins, he was eventually captured and hanged at Tyburn near York on April 28, 1770, and buried in the village of Heptonstall, W Yorks. His brother, Isaac, escaped the authorities and lived until 1815.
- Thomas McAnea, also known as Hologram Tam, a Scottish master counterfeiter regarded as one of the most skillful in Europe with regard to banknote security holograms.
- Emerich Juettner, documented in Mister 880, was possibly the longest uncaught counterfeiter in history. For ten or more years, he eluded government authorities while he printed and spent fake $1 bills in his New York neighborhood.
- Catherine Murphy, convicted of coining in 1789 and was the last woman to suffer execution by burning in England.
- John A. Murrell, a near-legendary bandit, operating in the United States along the Mississippi River in the mid-nineteenth century. Convicted for his crimes in the Circuit Court of Madison County, Tennessee, Murrell was incarcerated in the Tennessee State Penitentiary, modeled after the Auburn penal system, from 1834 to 1844.
- King Philip the Fair of France (1268–1314) caused riots and was known as "the counterfeiter king" for emitting coinage that was debased compared to the standards that had been prevalent during the half-century previous to his reign.
- Charles Price (swindler) (died 1787), prolific English counterfeiter and swindler who defrauded the Bank of England of £200,000
- Sturdivant Gang, a multi-generational group of American counterfeiters whose criminal activities took place over a 50-year period from Colonial Connecticut to the Illinois frontier.
- Samuel C. Upham, the first known counterfeiter of Confederate money during the American Civil War. His activities began or became known in early July 1862.
- Ceslaw Bojarski, imprisoned in 1964 for counterfeiting French Bonaparte 100 francs notes
- Wesley Weber, imprisoned in 2001 for counterfeiting the Canadian one-hundred-dollar bill.
- Arthur Williams, imprisoned in 2007 for counterfeiting the United States one-hundred-dollar bill.

== Penalties by country ==
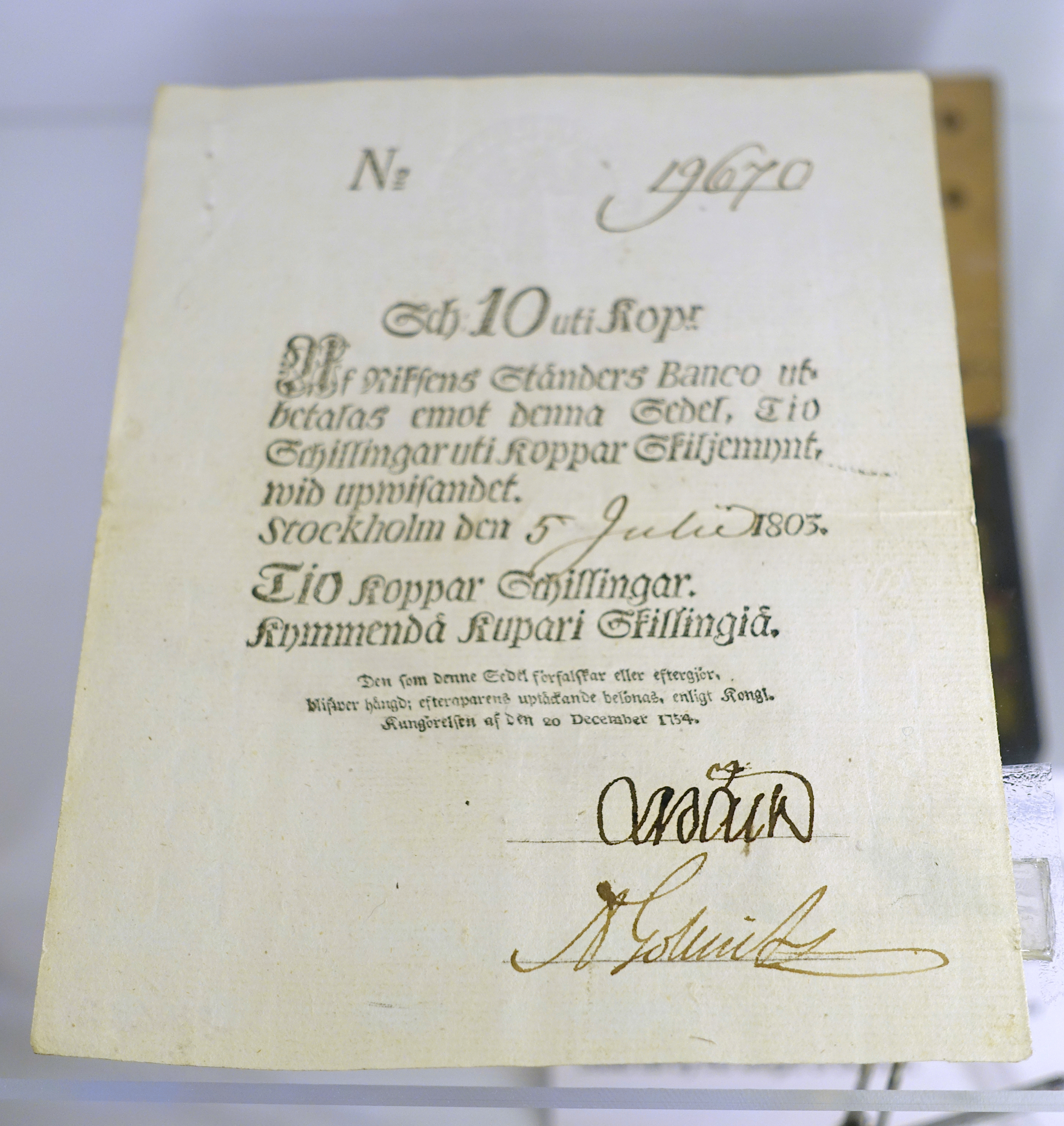
A Swedish 10 Riksdaler banknote from 1803, stating that counterfeiters will be hanged

Jurisdiction	Criminal penalties
Canada	Maximum 14 years' imprisonment
China, People's Republic of China	Maximum life imprisonment; minimum 3 years' imprisonment, with an accessory fine of 50,000 to 500,000 Chinese Yuan
France	Maximum 30 years' imprisonment, with a fine of €450,000
Germany	Maximum 15 years' imprisonment
Hong Kong	Maximum 14 years' imprisonment
Italy	Maximum 12 years' imprisonment and a fine up to €3,098
Japan	Maximum life imprisonment; minimum 3 years' imprisonment
Korea, South	Maximum life imprisonment; minimum 2 years
Macau	Maximum 12 years' imprisonment; minimum 2 years' imprisonment
Netherlands	Maximum 9 years' imprisonment, with a fine up to €67,000
Norway	Maximum 10 years' imprisonment in serious cases, or a fine
Philippines	Maximum 12 years' imprisonment; minimum 6 years' imprisonment
Poland	Maximum 25 years' imprisonment; minimum 5 years' imprisonment
Portugal	Varies depending on the type of money counterfeited based on bills and coins.: If bills: maximum 12 years' imprisonment, minimum 3 years' imprisonment; If coins: maximum 2 years' imprisonment, minimum 240 days' imprisonment
Singapore	Maximum 20 years' imprisonment, with a fine
Taiwan (Republic of China)	Maximum life imprisonment in extreme cases; minimum 5 years' imprisonment, with a possible fine
United Kingdom	Maximum 10 years' imprisonment, with a possible accessory fine; minimum a fine
United States	Maximum 20 years' imprisonment, with a possible accessory fine; minimum a fine
Zambia	Maximum life imprisonment, with a possible fine

== Money art ==
Parodies of banknotes, often produced for humorous, satirical or promotional purposes, are fantasy issues, referred to as 'skit notes'. (The term 'skit note' has been used since around the mid-19th century. Before that, the term 'flash note' was used.)

The street artist Banksy is known for making 10-pound notes that feature Princess Diana's portrait in place of Queen Elizabeth II, while "Bank of England" is replaced by "Banksy of England". The artist's original intent was to throw them off a building, but after some of the notes were dropped at a festival, he discovered that they could pass for legal tender and changed his mind. As of 2012, Banksy is still in possession of all one hundred million pounds' worth of the currency.

In 2006, American artist Jack Daws hired metalsmiths to make a mold of a 1970 U.S. penny and cast it in 18-karat gold. He then hired another metalsmith to copper-plate it, after which it looked like an ordinary penny. On March 28, 2007, Daws intentionally put the "penny" in circulation at Los Angeles International Airport (LAX). The sculpture was discovered in Brooklyn two-and-a-half years later by Jessica Reed, a graphic designer and coin collector, who noticed it while paying for groceries at a local store. Reed eventually communicated with Daws' Seattle art dealer, the Greg Kucera Gallery, and Daws confirmed that she had discovered the Counterfeit Penny sculpture.

== Training materials & educational resources ==
In May of 2017, Australian currency training notes (used in-house by Chinese banks in the training of bank tellers) were circulated briefly in Darwin, Northern Territory, with seven cases reported by the Northern Territory Police of notes being offered and taken as real money. The $100 (Australian dollar) notes had Chinese language characters printed on them but otherwise had the color and feel of real notes, and the Chinese characters can be disguised when the note is folded. They had been sold through eBay, with the disclaimer of not being for circulation. China also has an equivalent $50 (U.S. dollar) "training money" that has previously appeared in the USA. A variety of educational resources are available to help the public understand how to identify counterfeit currency. These include governmental guides, financial-sector publications, and independent tools that explain common security features used in modern banknotes. Several mobile apps and online platforms also provide information or step-by-step checks intended to assist users in recognizing suspicious notes.

== See also ==
- 3D printed firearm
- Copyright infringement
- Counterfeit banknote detection pen
- Digital currency
- Fantasy issue
- Money
- Money laundering
- Organized crime
- Russian mafia
- Triad (organized crime)
- World currency
