= Gyula Mészáros =

Hungarian ethnographer, Orientalist and Turkologist

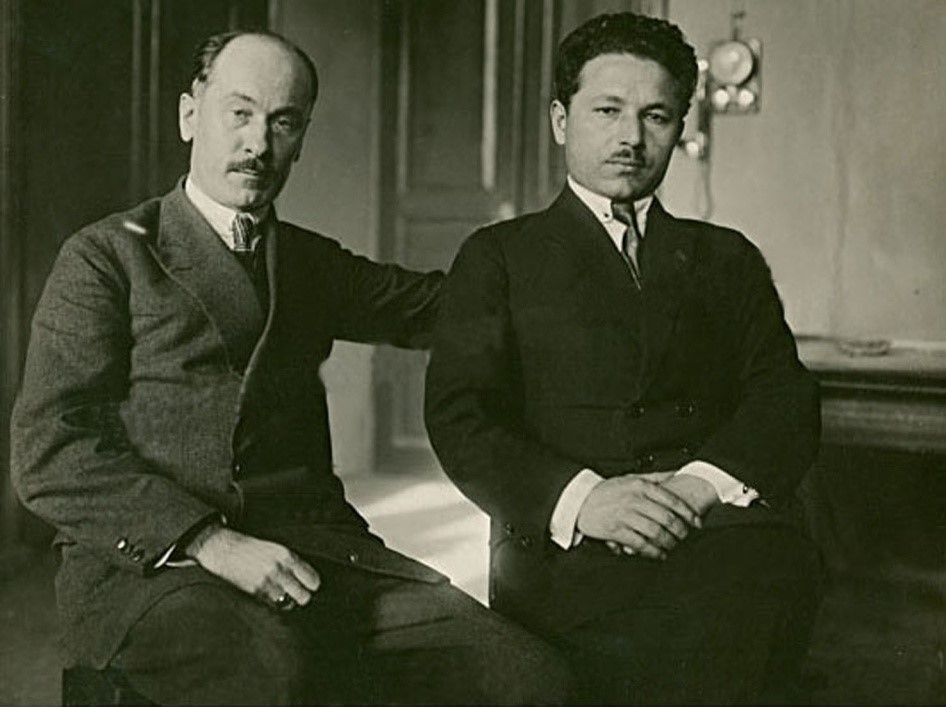
Gyula Mészáros and Bekir Çoban-zade in Baku in 1926

Gyula Mészáros (Hungarian: Mészáros Gyula; 1883 – 1957) was a Hungarian ethnographer, Orientalist and Turkologist. Later in his career he became involved in a money counterfeiting scheme.

== Money counterfeiting ==
In 1921, a group of Hungarian nationalists led by Mészáros set up a press in the town of Metzelsdorf outside Graz, Austria. The group managed to produce and put into circulation 60,000 500-Czechoslovak koruna banknotes, with the intent of damaging the Czechoslovak economy. Most of the forgers were arrested in July 1921, by that time the Czechoslovak government was forced to pull the entire sokol note series out of circulation, undermining the credibility of its currency reforms. Mészáros' case was dismissed by an Austrian court without going to trial, as there were no provisions to punish forgers who did not operate for personal gain.

The following year, Mészáros approached Prince Lajos Windischgraetz with a plan to counterfeit the French franc. Windischgraetz agreed to provide funding for the operation with Imre Nádosy, the Chief Captain of National Police joining the plot in the same year. The plan was put to a halt when Mészáros immigrated to Turkey and Windischgraetz realized that it relied on crude printing technology. Windischgraetz nevertheless pursued the execution of the plan with help from abroad in what came to be known as the Franc affair.
