= Lac de Derborence =

Lake in Conthey, Valais, Switzerland

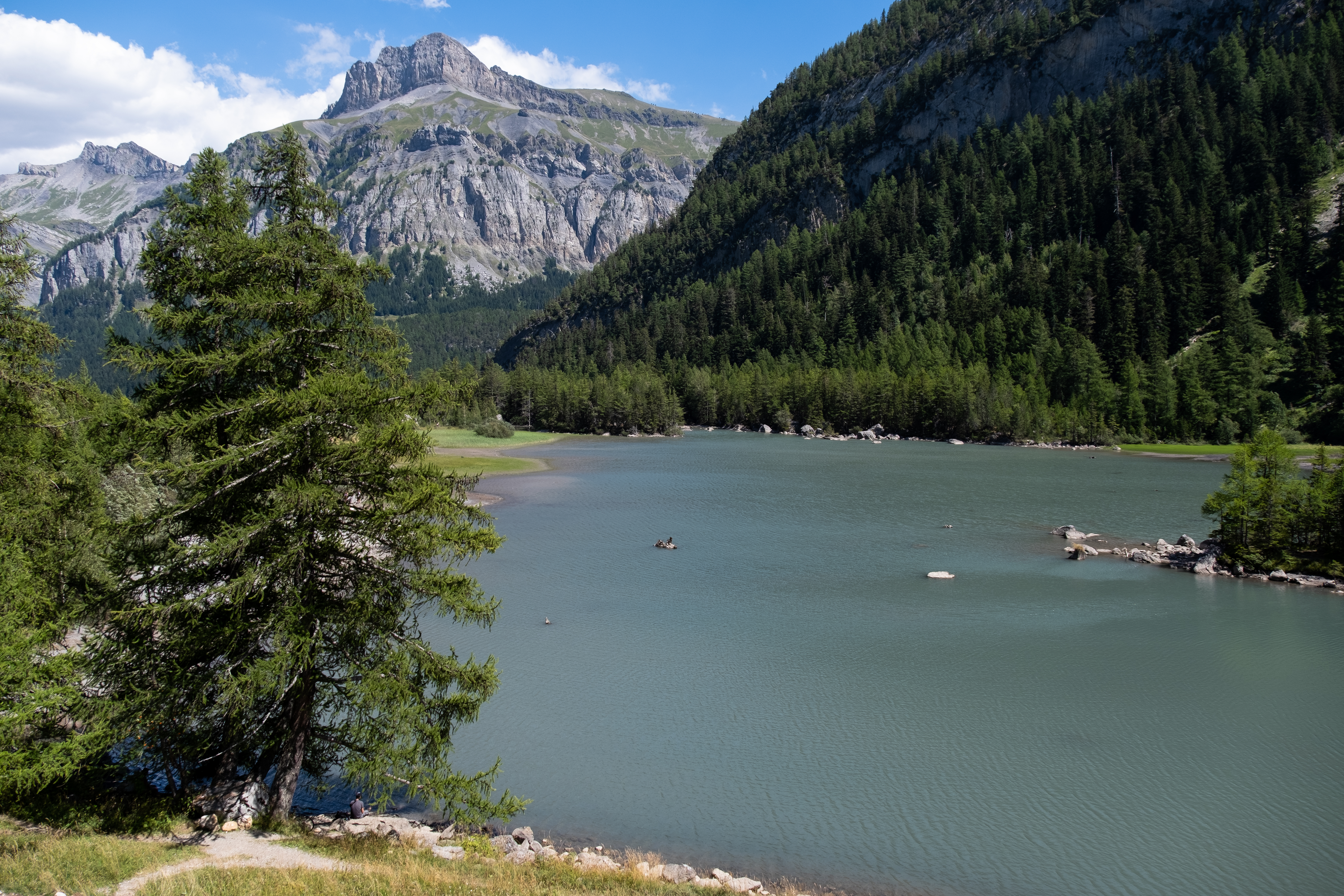
- View from the west side

- Location within Canton of Valais Location within Canton of Vaud Location within Switzerland Location within Alps
- Interactive map of Lac de Derborence
- Location: Conthey, Valais
- Coordinates: 46°16′44″N 7°13′2″E
- Primary inflows: Derbonne
- Basin countries: Switzerland
- Surface area: 4.4 ha (11 acres)
- Surface elevation: 1,449 m (4,754 ft)

Lac de Derborence is a mountain lake in the municipality of Conthey, Valais, Switzerland, located near the hamlet of Derborence. It was formed after rockfalls on 24 September 1714 and 23 June 1749. In 1749, an estimated 50 million m^{3} of rocks blocked the course of the Derbonne river and led to the formation of the lake.

== See also ==
- List of mountain lakes of Switzerland
