= Roger Pfund =

Swiss graphic artist (1943–2024)

Roger Pfund (28 December 1943 – 16 March 2024) was a Swiss graphic artist.

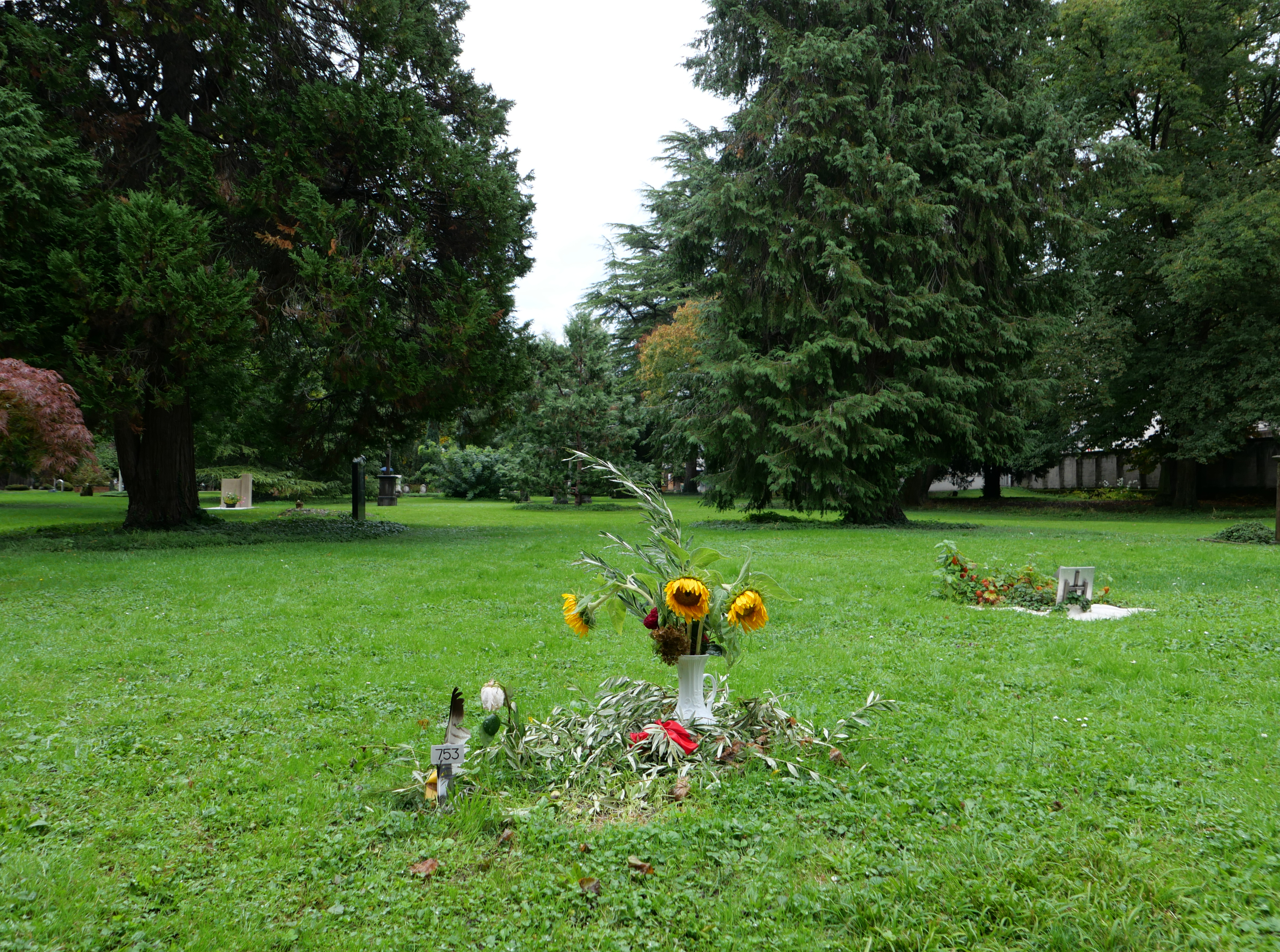
The grave in 2024.

In 1970–1971, Pfund won the currency design contest, hosted by the Swiss National Bank, for the design of a new series of bank notes. However another design was printed.

Pfund is also credited with the creation of the last version of the French franc, as well as a series of the Euro, and the 2003 Swiss passport.

Pfund died on 16 March 2024, at the age of 80 from complications following an infection. He was buried at the Cimetière des Rois, which is considered the Panthéon of Geneva.

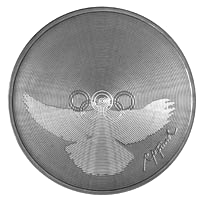
Obverse of a 1988 commemorative coin (5 Swiss Francs) by Roger Pfund.

== Sources ==
- Roger Pfund. Tome III, Orell Füssli Verlag AG, 2006. ISBN 3-280-05209-2
