= North German thaler =

Northern German currency from 1690 to 1873

The North German thaler was a currency used by several states of Northern Germany from 1690 to 1873, first under the Holy Roman Empire, then by the German Confederation. Originally equal to the Reichsthaler specie or silver coin from 1566 until the Kipper und Wipper crisis of 1618, a thaler currency unit worth less than the Reichsthaler specie was first defined in 1667 and became widely used after adoption of the Leipzig currency standard of 1690.

After the 1840s, the different North German states made their thalers equal in value to the Prussian thaler; these thalers were then put on par with the Vereinsthaler in 1857. The various North German thalers and vereinsthalers were all replaced in 1873 by the German gold mark at the rate of 3 marks per thaler.

Several old books confusingly use the same term Reichsthaler for the specie silver coin as well as the currency unit. This is disambiguated by referring to the full-valued coin as the Reichsthaler specie and the lower-valued currency unit as the Reichsthaler currency (courant, kurant).

== History ==
=== The Reichsthaler specie ===
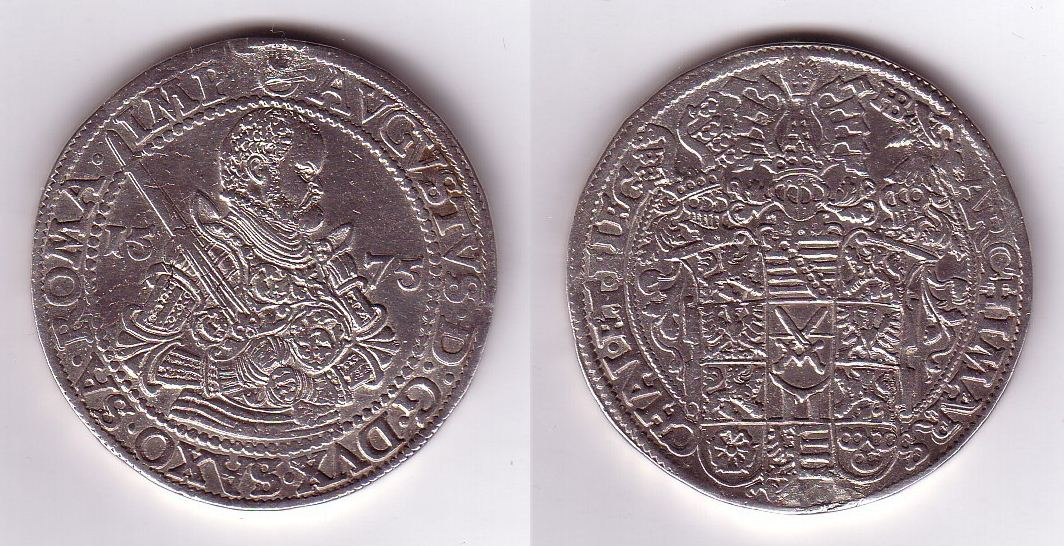
Reichsthaler specie, 1575, of the Electorate of Saxony

In 1566 the Holy Roman Empire first introduced the Reichsthaler specie as a standard silver coin of all German states, minted 9 to a Cologne Mark of fine silver, or 25.984 g. It was divided into 24 gutegroschen, with each gutegroschen divided into 12 pfennig. Its value versus the currency unit, the guilder, rose from 1.2 gulden after 1566 to 1.5 gulden in 1618 just before the Thirty Years' War and Kipper und Wipper financial crisis destroyed the value of the gulden as well as Germany's financial system.

=== Lower-valued thaler after 1630 ===
After 1630 the different North German states reconstructed their currency systems with a Thaler worth 24 gutegroschen or 1 1/2 gulden, but little is on record with regard to the mint systems until after 1667. They were thus on a de facto thaler currency system with some uncertainty in the thaler's value versus the Reichsthaler specie. A currency trial done in 1665 indicated a lower prevailing (and unofficial) rate of 14 1/4 gulden or 9 1/2 thaler to a Cologne Mark.

Here is a summary of the evolution of standards of the North German thaler from 1667 to 1873 in grams of silver, together with the Reichsthaler specie (or Conventionsthaler specie after 1753), the Austro-Hungarian florin and the South German gulden.

Values of the Thaler specie, North German thaler, Austro-Hungarian florin & South German gulden, in grams of silver unless otherwise stated.
Year	Thaler specie	North German thaler	Austrian gulden	South German gulden
1667		22.272		
1690	25.984	19.488	12.992	12.992
1741		1.2 g gold	0.8 g gold	0.68 g gold
1753	23.3856	17.539	11.693	9.744
1840		16.704	11.693	9.545
1857		16.667	11.111	9.524

=== Zinnaische Standard, 1667 ===
The Zinnaische currency standard was agreed upon in 1667 by Saxony and Brandenburg at Zinna, defining for the first time de jure a North German thaler currency issued at 10 1/2 to a Cologne Mark of silver, lower than the standard for the Reichsthaler specie at 9 to a Mark. While this system was implemented by the more financially able North German states (most notably by Hamburg, Lübeck & Denmark), it would not be widely adopted until the introduction of the Leipzig standard of 1690.

=== Leipzig Standard, 1690 ===
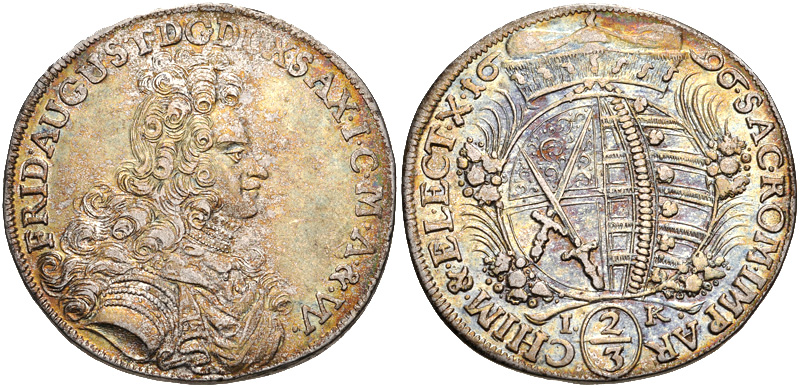
Gulden or 2/3 thaler of Frederick Augustus I of Saxony, 1696

The Leipzig standard was first introduced in 1690 by Saxony, Brandenburg, Brunswick and Lüneburg; in a few years this standard prevailed all over the Holy Roman Empire in the form of the North German thaler and the South German gulden. It defined the thaler and gulden currency units in relation to the Reichsthaler specie coin, as follows:

- The Reichsthaler Specie is issued 9 to a Cologne Mark of fine silver, or 25.984 g;
- The North German Thaler currency of 24 gutegroschen is 3/4 of specie, or 12 to a Mark, or 19.488 g silver; and
- The South German & Austrian Gulden of 60 kreuzer is 1/2 of specie, or 18 to a Mark, or 12.992 g silver.

At the same time this standard was introduced, the gold florin or Rhenish gulden of 2.5036 g was advanced to a value of 2 56/60 gulden or 1 23/24 thaler – hence, 1.2784 g fine gold per thaler and a gold-silver ratio of 15.2. This would be Germany's new predominant currency system entering the 18th century.

=== Unofficial Gold Standard, 1730s ===
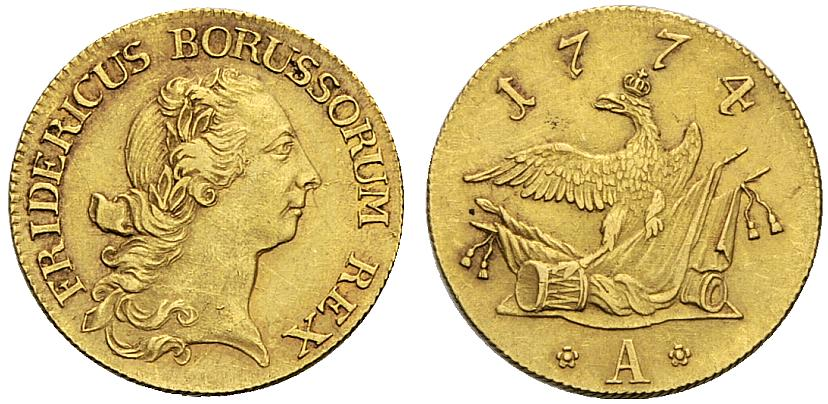
The Prussian Friedrich d'or pistole worth 5 thalers was introduced in 1741.

The Leipzig currency system entered another era of crisis and fragmentation in the 18th century due to the War of the Spanish Succession of 1700–1714 and the War of the Austrian Succession of 1740–1748. In 1726 France devalued the livre tournois from 8.31 g to 4.505 g silver, and the gold-silver ratio went down from 15 to 14.5.

For the stronger states in Northern Germany & Austria this meant the opportunity to reissue their thaler and gulden currencies from silver to cheaper gold – hence an unofficial gold standard. By the 1730s the gold florin of 2.5036 g was valued at 3 Austrian florins or 2 North German thalers; hence each thaler was worth 1.2518 g fine gold or 18.15 g fine silver at France's gold ratio of 14.5 (vs 19.488 g silver originally). In 1741 Frederick the Great of Prussia issued the 6-gram gold Friedrich d'or pistole for a value of five thalers. It made the thaler even cheaper at 1.2 g gold or 17.4 g silver, and several North German states also came up with their own five-thaler pistoles.

For the South German states neighboring France, though, the need to lower their currencies even more had become much more acute, resulting in a South German gulden of lower value than the Austro-Hungarian florin which was made official after 1753.

=== Austrian Convention Standard, 1753 ===
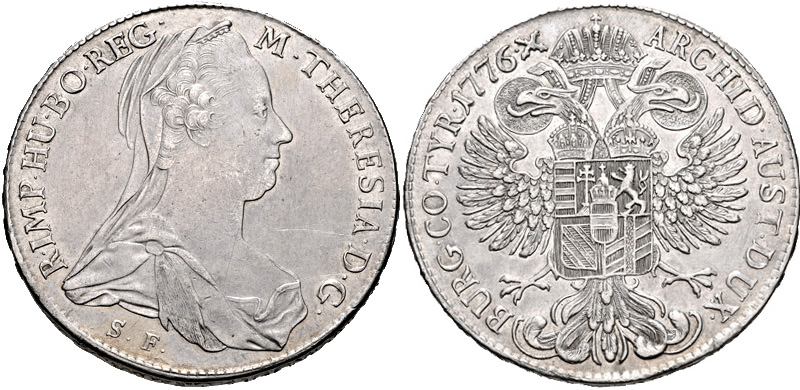
Maria Theresa Thaler, the most famous example of the Conventionsthaler, 1776

The Austrian Convention currency standard (Konventionsfuß) was first introduced in 1750 to the territories of the Austrian Empire and in 1753 to the rest of Germany without taking measures to secure the cooperation of the other circles of the Holy Roman Empire. It restored the Reichsthaler's silver footing at a rate 10% lower than the Leipzig standard, as follows:

- The new Conventionsthaler specie coin, issued 10 to a Cologne Mark of fine silver; hence 23.3856 g.
- The North German thaler of 24 gutegroschen = 3/4 of Conventionsthaler; hence 13 1/3 to a Mark, or 17.5392 g.
- The Austro-Hungarian florin of 60 kreuzer = 1/2 of Conventionsthaler; hence 20 to a Mark, or 11.6928 g.

Several other states did not comply with this footing, however. The Southern German states settled on a lower-valued South German gulden worth 24 to a Cologne Mark of fine silver or 9.744 g. The Prussian Thaler was also set lower at 14 to a Cologne Mark or 16.704 g.

Most of the North German thalers were divided into 24 gutegroschen, with each gutegroschen equal to 12 pfennig. Silver coins minted for circulation include the Conventionsthaler worth 32 gutegroschen or 1 1/3 thalers; guldens worth 16 gutegroschen or 2/3 thaler, and smaller coins worth 8, 4, 2 and 1 gutegroschen. The pistole of 6 grams of fine gold, together with double- and half-pistole coins, became (along with the ducat) the preferred gold currency in Northern Germany, with each pistole trading at five thalers plus a variable agio (premium) after gold prices rebounded in the second half of the 18th century.

=== Prussian Thaler and Vereinsthaler after 1840 ===
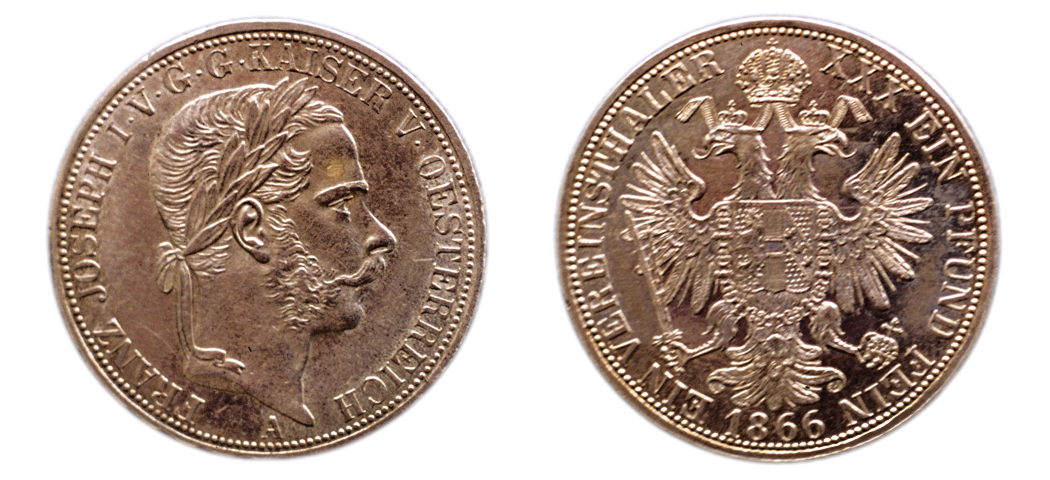
Vereinsthaler issued by Austria, 1866

The final task of currency unification in Germany was completed by Prussia between 1837 and 1873 after the Napoleonic Wars. The Zollverein customs union of 1834 unleashed a more vigorous adoption of the Prussian thaler of 14 to a Cologne Mark (16.704 g fine silver). In 1837 the Southern German states fixed the South German Gulden at 1 3/4 gulden to the Prussian thaler, or 24 1/2 gulden to a Mark. After the 1840s the different Northern German states fixed their respective thalers at par with the Prussian thaler also at 14 to a Mark.

Concurrent with this switchover was a change in coin subdivisions, with the thaler now divided into 30 silbergroschen. New silver coins were issued for 10 silbergroschen worth 1/3 thaler, as well as smaller coins for 5, 2 1/2 and 1 silbergroschen.

In 1857 all German states and Austria agreed to mint the Vereinsthaler of 16 2/3 grams fine silver, of marginally smaller weight than the Prussian thaler's 16.704 g, but still accepted at par with the Northern German thaler. Austria also lowered its gulden to 2/3 of the Vereinsthaler or 11 1/9 g.

=== Gold Standard ===
All North German thalers and Vereinsthalers were retired after 1873 in favor of the German gold mark, with each mark containing 100/279 gram of fine gold, at the rate of 1 thaler = 3 marks, or a gold ratio of 15.5. While new silver coins issued under the mark were limited legal tender for payments under 20 marks, the Vereinsthaler retained full, unlimited legal tender status until it was demonetized in 1908.

== Other ==
Thaler currencies identical to the North German thaler include the Hesse-Kassel thaler, Saxon thaler and Stolberg thaler, though not all may be divided into 24 gutegroschen.

Currencies identical to the Vereinsthaler, and all divided into 30 silbergroschen, include the Prussian vereinsthaler, Hanoverian vereinsthaler, Hesse-Kassel vereinsthaler and Mecklenburg vereinsthaler.

A number of North German states followed both the Leipzig standard after 1690 and the unofficial gold standard after 1730, but did not follow the Austrian Convention standard of 13 1/3 to a Cologne Mark (or 17.539 g fine silver) after 1753. The most notable of these are as follows:

- The Prussian thaler adopted the Graumannscher Fuß (Graumann footing) of 1/14 of a Cologne Mark, or 16.704 g fine silver. After 1840, however, several North German states lowered their thalers to match this standard.
- The Bremen thaler retained the gold standard until German unification in 1871, with five thalers to a Friedrich d'or pistole, or about 1.2 g fine gold per thaler. It was also divided differently, into 72 grote. After 1857 this standard was defined more exactly at 8.4 thalers per 10 grams fine gold, or 1 4/21 g gold per thaler.
- The Hanoverian thaler reverted to the Leipzig standard of 1/12 of a Cologne Mark after the rise in gold prices in the second half of the 18th century. It was also divided differently into 36 mariengroschen. In 1834 Hanover phased out this stronger standard in favor of the Prussian thaler.
- Currencies of identical value to the Hanoverian thaler include the Mecklenburg thaler and the Westphalian thaler.

Currencies whose standards differed from the North German thaler after 1690 include:

- The Hamburg mark and the Lübeck mark.
- The Danish rigsdaler, Norwegian rigsdaler and Swedish riksdaler. They were also issued in multiple versions labeled specie or courant.
- All écus and thalers issued in Switzerland listed here: Swiss franc#Before the Helvetic Confederation

== See also ==
- Reichsthaler
- Conventionsthaler
- Austro-Hungarian florin
- South German Gulden
- Prussian thaler
- Vereinsthaler
