= Thaler =

Large silver coin used in 16th- to 19th-century Europe

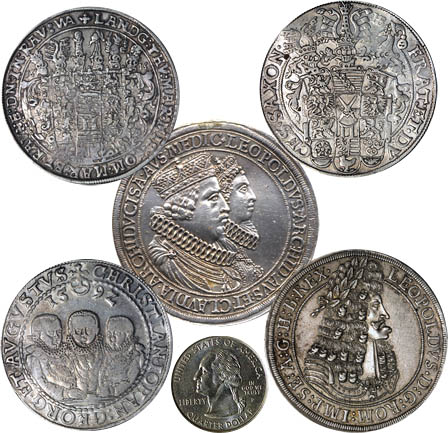
Four thalers and one double thaler, compared to a U.S. quarter (bottom center): Clockwise from top left: Saxe-Altenburg 1616 (reverse), Saxony 1592, Austria 1701 (obverse), Saxony 1592 (obverse), Center: double thaler, Austria 1635 (obverse).

A thaler, or taler (/ˈtɑːlər/ TAH-lər; German: Taler [ˈtaːlɐ], previously spelled Thaler), is one of the large silver coins minted in the states and territories of the Holy Roman Empire and the Habsburg monarchy during the Early Modern period. A thaler size silver coin has a diameter of about 40 mm (1 1/2 in) and a weight of about 25 to 30 grams (roughly 1 ounce). The word is shortened from Joachimsthaler, the original thaler coin minted in Joachimsthal, Bohemia, from 1520.

While the first standard coin of the Holy Roman Empire was the Guldengroschen of 1524, its longest-lived coin was the Reichsthaler, which contained 1/9 Cologne Mark of fine silver (or 25.984 g), and which was issued in various versions from 1566 to 1875. From the 17th century a lesser-valued North German thaler currency unit emerged, which by the 19th century became par with the Vereinsthaler.

The thaler silver coin type continued to be minted until the 20th century in the form of the Mexican peso until 1914, the five Swiss franc coin until 1928, the US silver dollar until 1935, and the Austrian Maria Theresa thaler. Thaler-sized silver coins are no longer in active circulation but are minted by various government mints as bullion or numismatic items for collectors. The current derivative of the name, dollar (first Spanish and now mostly English), also survives as the name of several modern currencies.

== Etymology ==
German taler is recorded from the 1530s, as an abbreviation of Joachimstaler. The silver mines at Joachimstal had opened in 1516, and the first such coins were minted there in 1518. The original spelling was taler (so Alberus 1540). German -taler means "of the valley" (cf. Neanderthaler) -- cognate with English "dale", which also means "valley". By the late 16th century, the word was variously spelled as German taler, toler, thaler, thaller; Low German daler, dahler. In 18th to 19th-century German orthography, Thaler became standard, changed to Taler in the 1902 spelling reform.

The name taler, thaler was soon used in compounds denoting various types of silver coins of thaler size, thus Reichstaler (1566), Silbertaler, Albertustaler (1612), Laubthaler (1726), Kronenthaler (1755), Ortsthaler, Schützentaler, Bankthaler, Speciethaler, etc.

Units used in the Netherlands include the daalder, the rijksdaalder and the leeuwendaalder. From 1754, many German states used the Conventionsthaler as well as a lower-valued North German thaler, or Reichsthaler, worth 3/4 Conventionsthaler. From 1840 the various North German thalers converged to the value of the Prussian thaler and afterwards the Vereinsthaler.

The corresponding English silver coin of the period was the crown. The Low German word was adopted in English as daler by 1550, modified to dollar by about 1600. English thaler was introduced in the first half of the 19th century to refer to the coins of the German states, as the word dollar was increasingly understood to refer to the United States dollar.

== Predecessors ==
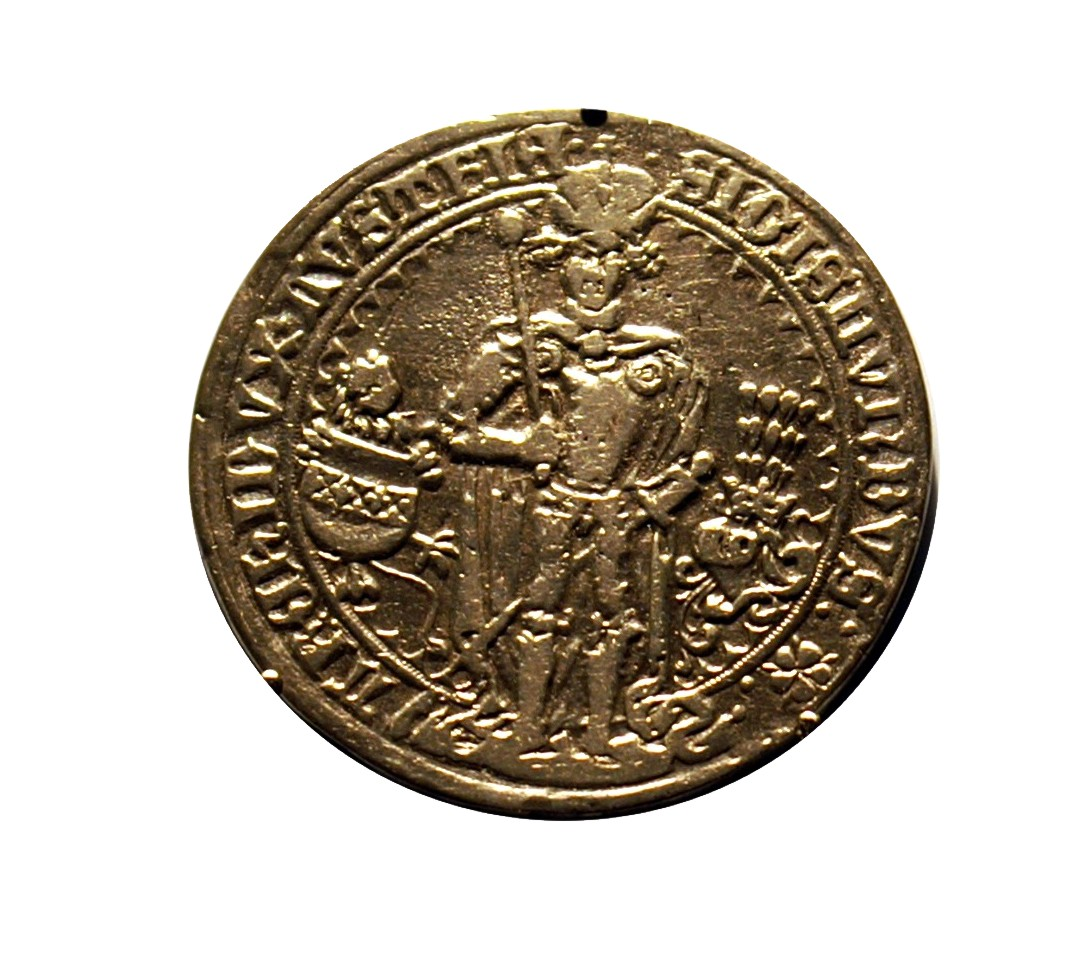
The 1486 Guldengroschen (obverse)

The development of large silver coins is an innovation of the beginning Early Modern period. The largest medieval silver coins were known as groats (German Groschen), from denarius grossus, "thick penny". These rarely exceeded a weight of six grams.

Even these coins were increasingly debased due to the Great Bullion Famine of the 15th century, which occurred for several reasons, including continued warfare and the centuries-long loss of silver and gold in indirect one-sided trades importing spices, porcelain, silk and other fine cloths and exotic goods from India, Indonesia and the Far East. This continual debasement had reached a point that silver content in Groschen-type coins had dropped, in some cases, to less than five percent, making the coins of much less individual value than they had in the beginning.

This trend was inverted with the discovery of new and substantial silver deposits in Europe beginning in about the 1470s. Italy began the first tentative steps toward a large silver coinage with the introduction in 1472 of the Venetian lira tron, in excess of six grams, a substantial increase over the four-gram gros tournois of France. However, it was only in 1484 that Archduke Sigismund of Tirol issued the first truly revolutionary silver coin, the half Guldengroschen, of roughly 15 g. This was a very rare coin, almost a trial piece, but it did circulate so successfully that demand could not be met.

Finally, with the silver deposits—being mined at Schwaz—to work with and his mint at Hall, Sigismund issued in 1486 large numbers of the first true thaler-sized coin, the Guldengroschen ("gold-groat", being of silver but equal in value to a Goldgulden). Soon it was being copied widely by many states who had the necessary silver. The engravers began creating intricate and elaborate designs featuring the heraldic arms and standards of the minting state as well as realistic, sometimes unflattering, depictions of the ruler (monarch).

== Joachimsthaler ==
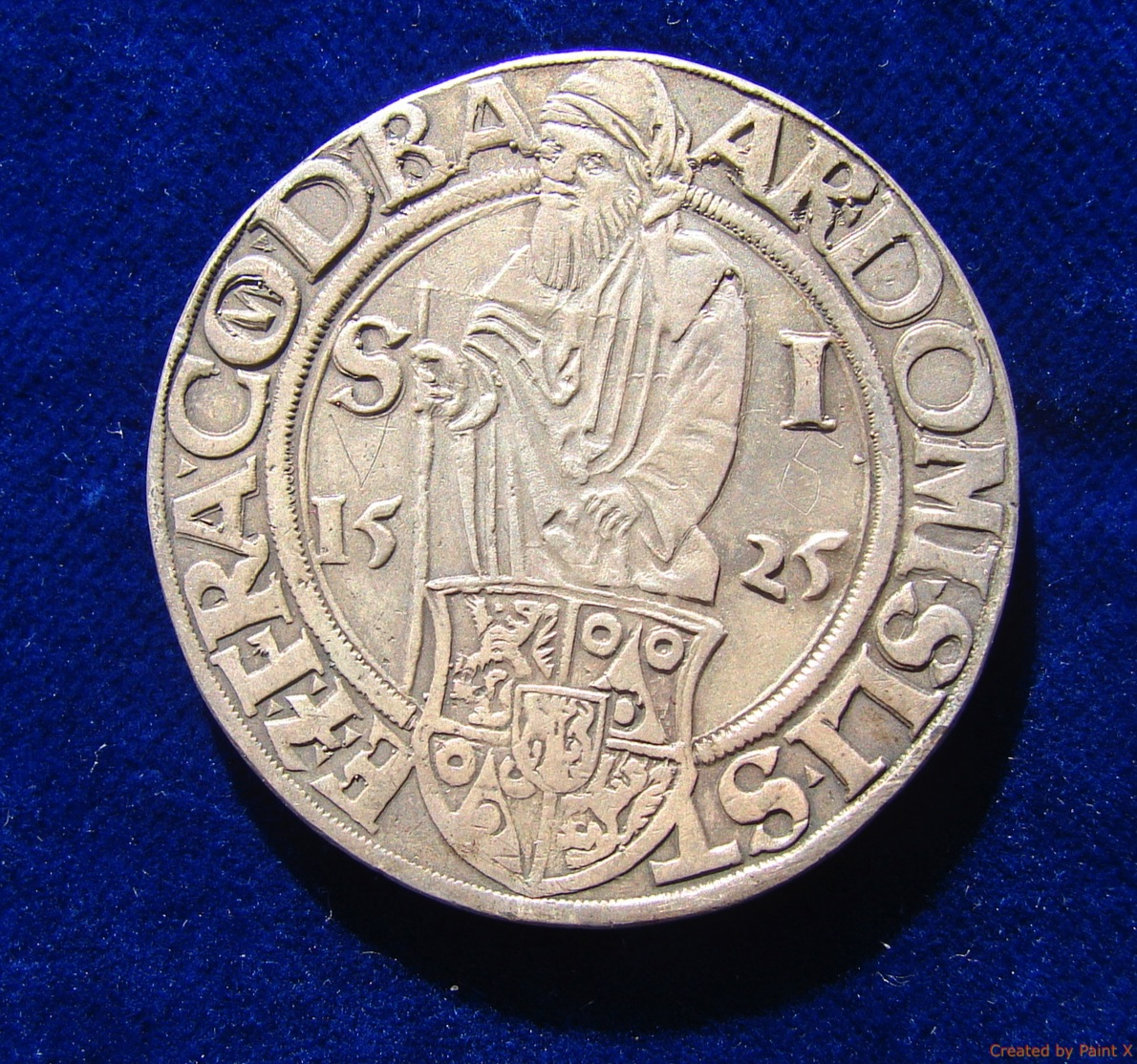
Obverse

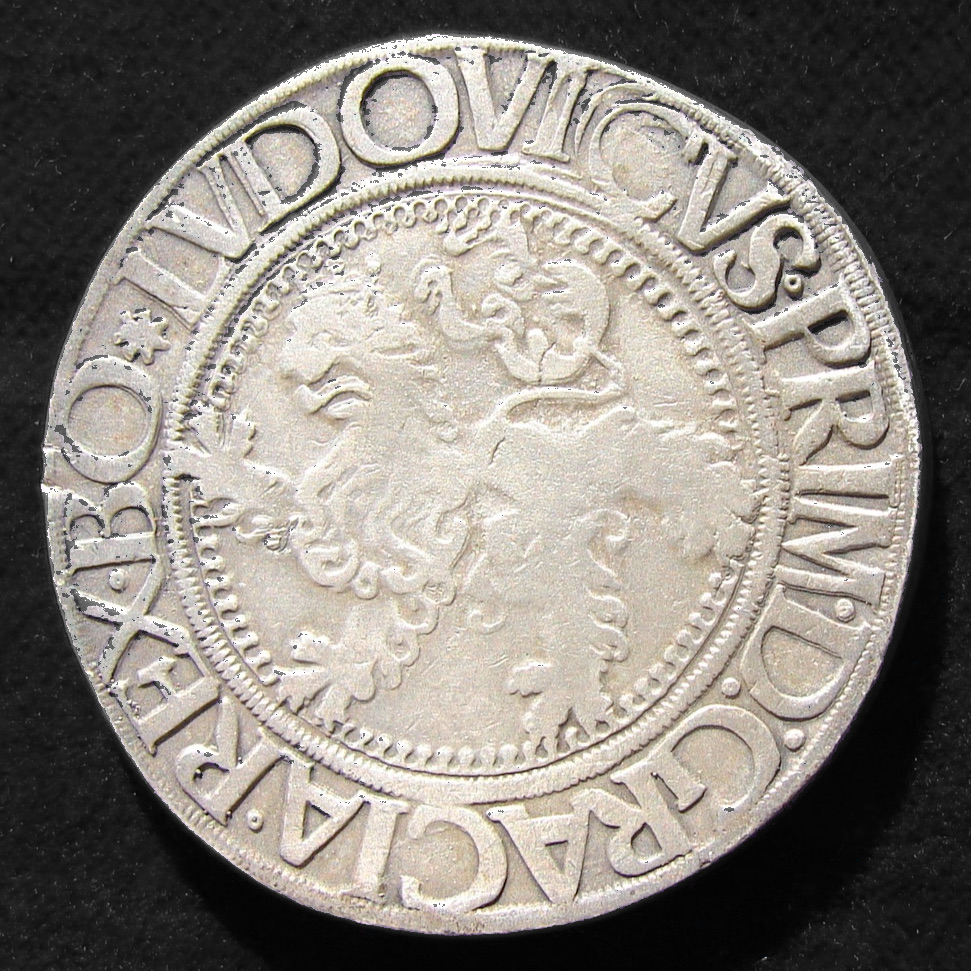
Reverse

Electrotype copy of a 1525 Joachimsthaler of the Kingdom of Bohemia. The obverse side pictures St Joachim, the reverse side features the Bohemian Lion and the name of King Louis.

By 1518, guldiners of similar weight to guldengroschen were popping up everywhere in central Europe. In the Kingdom of Bohemia, then ruled together with Hungary by Louis II of the Jagiellonian dynasty, a guldiner was minted— of similar physical size but slightly less fineness—that was named in German the Joachimsthaler, from the silver mined by the Counts of Schlick at a rich source near Joachimsthal (today Jáchymov in the Czech Republic) where Thal (Tal) means "valley" in German. Saint Joachim, the father of the Virgin Mary, was portrayed on the coin along with the Bohemian lion.

Similar coins began to be minted in neighbouring valleys rich in silver deposits, each named after the particular thal, or valley, from which the silver was extracted. There were soon so many of them that these silver coins began to be known more widely as 'thaler' in German and 'tolar' in Czech.

In the 17th century, some Joachimsthalers were in circulation in the Tsardom of Russia, where they were called yefimok (ефимок) – a distortion of the name Joachim.

== Holy Roman Empire ==
The new large silver coins that became ubiquitous as the 16th century went on were named Thaler in German, while in England and France, they were named crown and écu, respectively, both names taken from what had originally been gold coins. The thaler-size silver coin minted in Habsburg Spain was the eight-real coin, later also known as peso and, in English, as the Spanish dollar.

The first large silver coin standardized by the Holy Roman Empire was the Guldengroschen in 1524. Under the new Imperial Minting Standard (Reichsmünzfuß) it contained 1/8th a Cologne Mark of silver, or 29.232 g, and had a fineness 0.9375. However, its longest-lasting standard coin was the Reichsthaler ("imperial thaler"), defined in 1566 as containing 1/9th a Cologne Mark of fine silver, or 25.984 g. It was widely adopted and produced for the next 300 years at rates varying from 9 to 9 1/4 Reichsthalers to the Mark.

See the chronology of thaler development for the development of the Reichsthaler and related currency units from 1566 to 1875. Confusingly, there also was defined a North German thaler currency (also called Reichsthalers) of less value to the standard Reichsthaler specie coin; this thaler was worth 12 to a Mark after 1690, 13 1/3 to a Mark after 1754, and 14 to a Mark (the Prussian thaler) by the 1840s. Furthermore, in 1754 a Conventionsthaler was developed by the Austrian Empire minted at 10 to a Mark of fine silver. While it was adopted by most German states, Scandinavia and a few North German states retained the original Reichsthaler specie of 9 1/4 to a Mark as their standard coin until 1875.

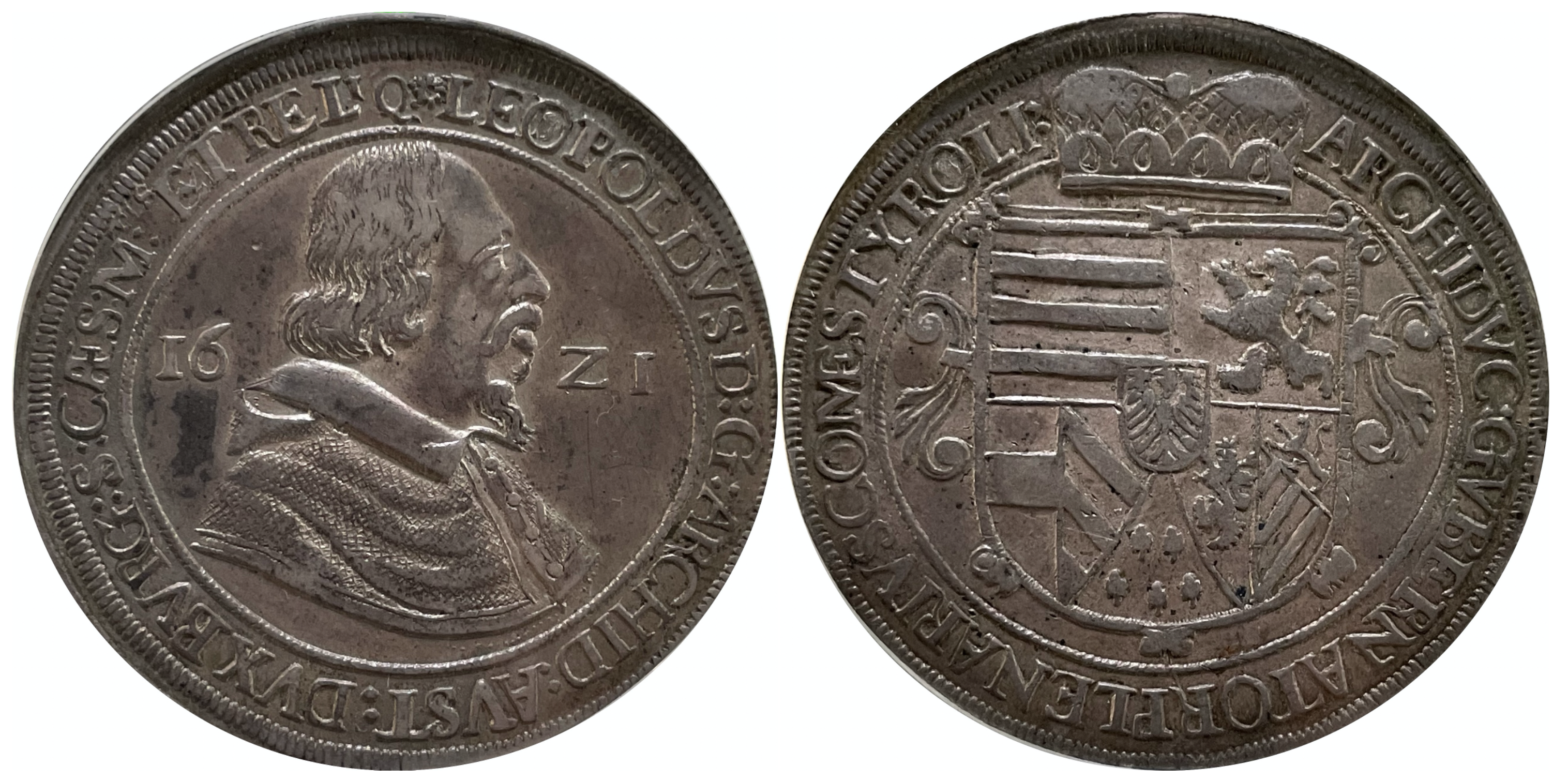
thaler of the County of Tyrol, Leopold V - 1621.

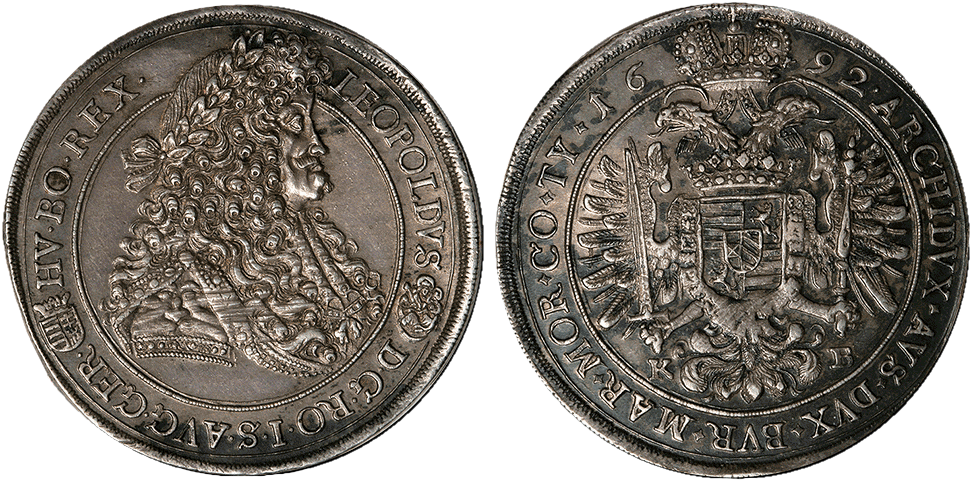
Reichsthaler of Leopold I, minted in Kremnitz in 1692.

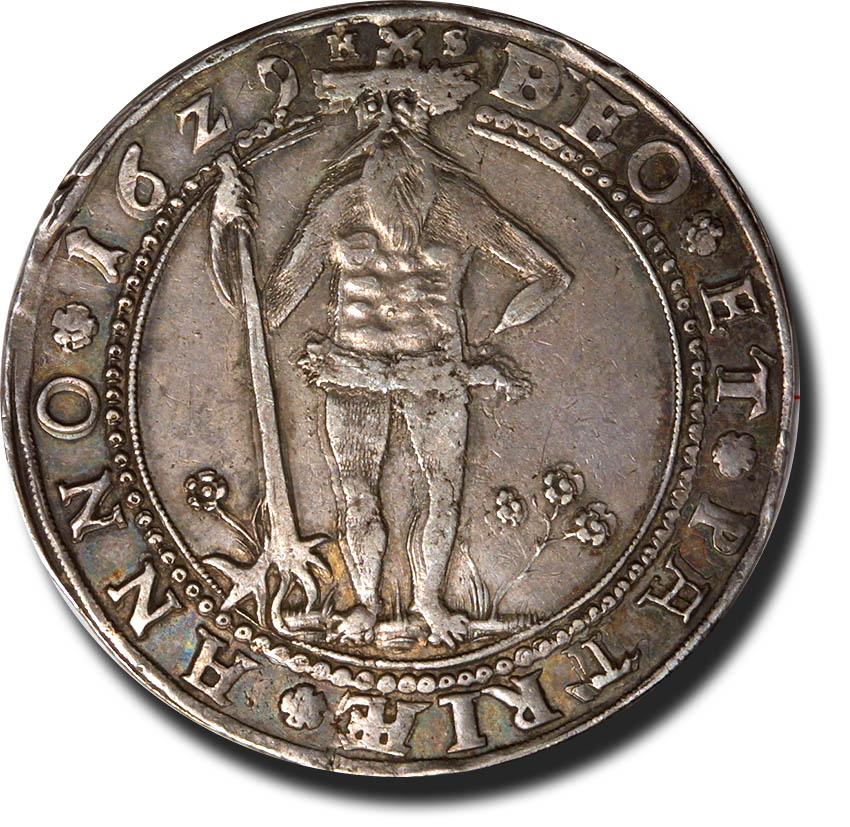
17th-century thaler coin from Brunswick-Wolfenbüttel with the traditional woodwose design on coins from the mints in the Harz mountains.

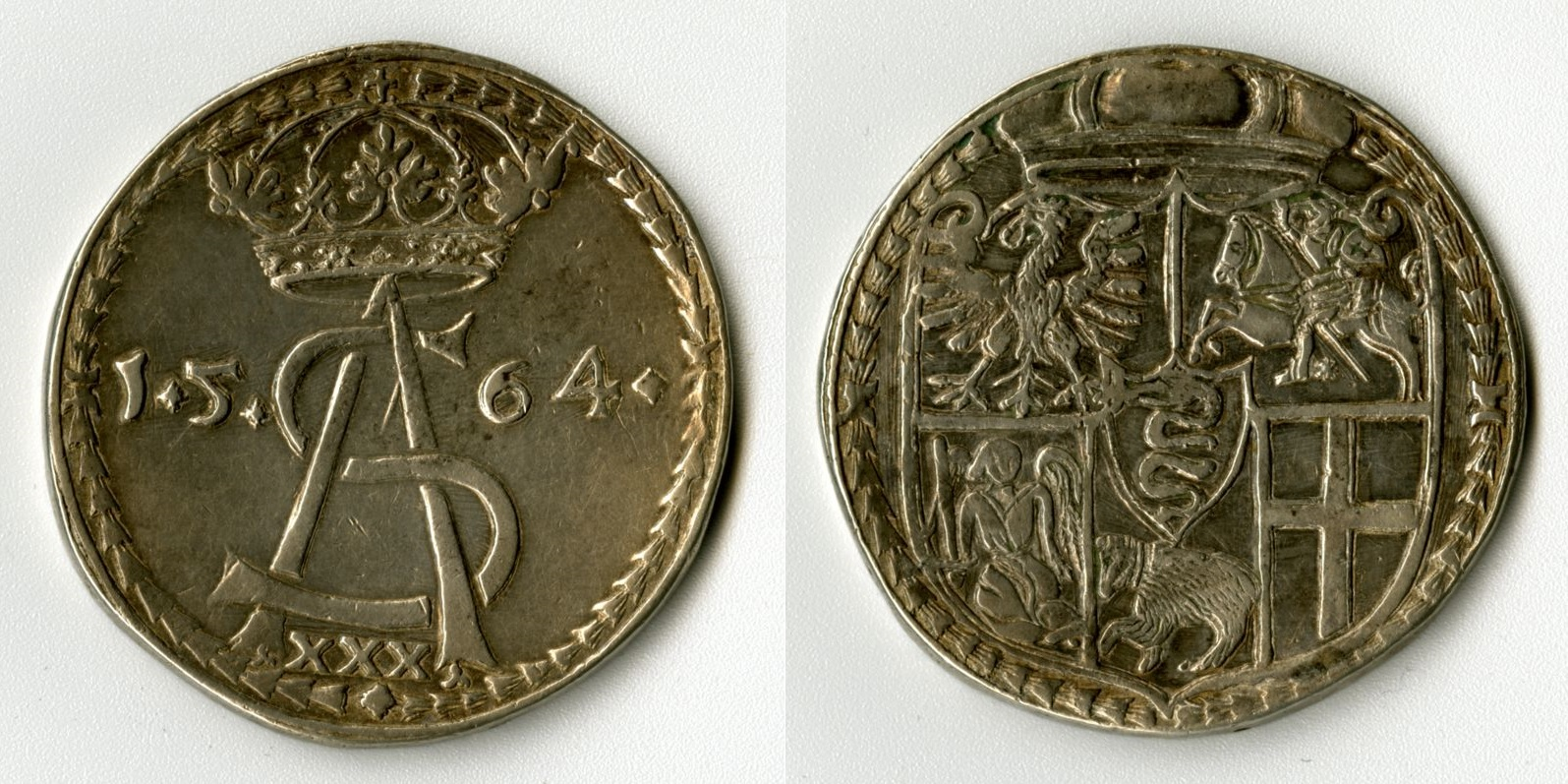
Lithuanian Thaler of Sigismund II Augustus, minted in Vilnius Mint

=== City view thalers and lösers ===
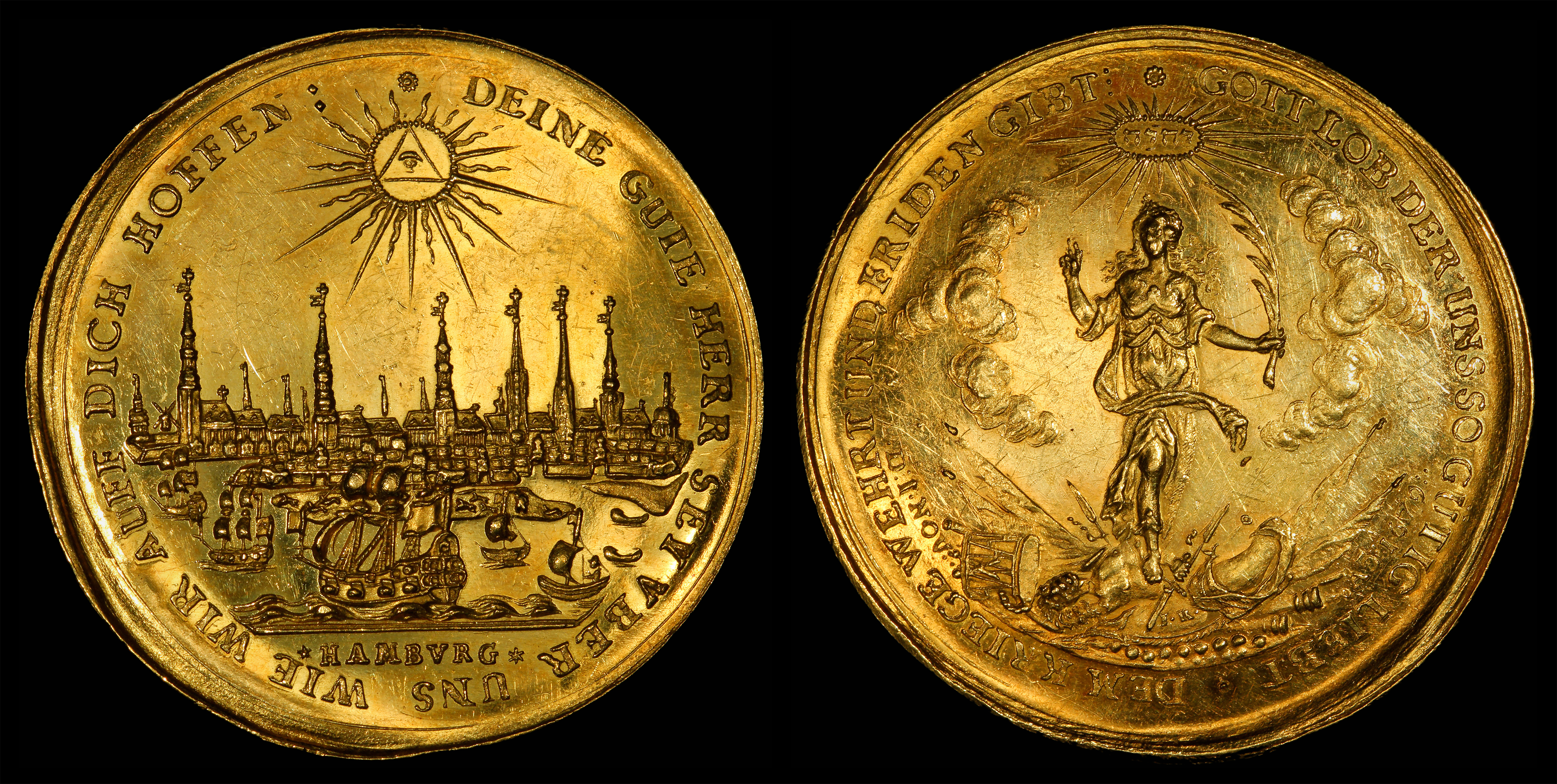
Half portugalöser (five ducats) minted in Hamburg, 1679

The "city view" thalers of the 17th and 18th century have predecessors in stylised representations of cities (as three towers, or a city gate) on the obverse of thaler coins in the late 16th century, such as the Lüneburg thaler of Rudolf II made in 1584. More elaborate city views become current in the first half of the 17th century (e.g. Augsburg 1627, Nuremberg 1631). The type continues to be popular throughout the 18th century, culminating in detailed city panoramas rendered in one-point perspective.

In the late 16th and 17th centuries, there was a fashion of oversized thaler coins, the so-called "multiple thalers", often called Löser in Germany. The first were minted in the Duchy of Brunswick-Luneburg, and indeed the majority were struck there. Some of these coins reached colossal size, as much as sixteen normal thalers, exceeding a full pound (over 450 g) of silver and being over 12 cm (5 in) in diameter. The name Löser most likely was derived from a large gold coin minted in Hamburg called the portugalöser, worth 10 ducats, which were based on Portuguese 10-ducat coins. Eventually the term was applied to numerous similar coins worth more than a single thaler. These coins are very rare and highly sought after by collectors. As few of them were circulated in any real sense, they are often well-preserved.

== Dutch Republic ==
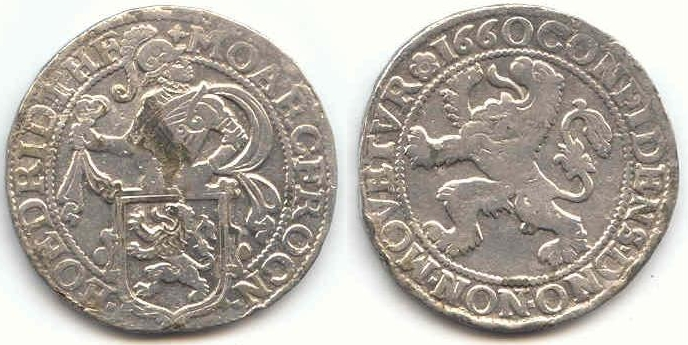
leeuwendaalder, or lion thaler, 1660, depicting a lion, the origin of the Bulgarian "Lev", Romanian "Leu" and Moldovan "Leu"

Dutch rijksdaalder, 1622

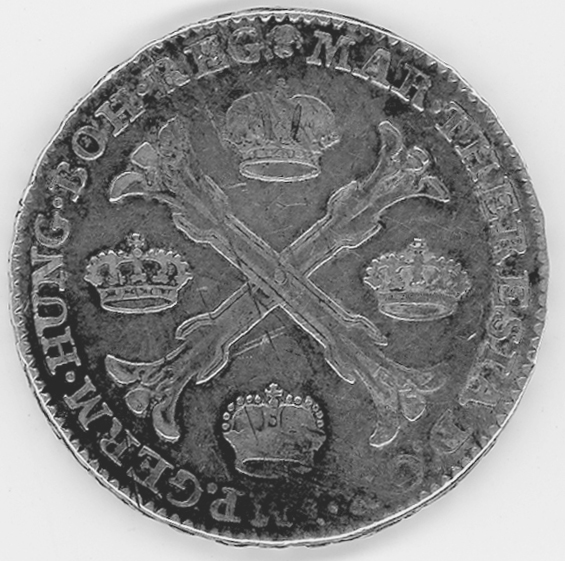
Maria Theresa Kronenthaler, 1770, showing the Burgundian Cross with four crowns

The Spanish Netherlands and the independent Dutch Republic has had a history of minting large silver coins separately from the rest of the Holy Roman Empire. It issued the kruisdaalder (depicting the Cross of Burgundy) in 1567, and then the leeuwendaalder (the "lion thaler", depicting the Belgic Lion) in 1575, the latter of weight 27.68 g (427.2 grains) and 0.743 fineness. With the growing popularity of the German reichsthaler, however, the Republic of the Seven United Netherlands had to follow up with their own Dutch rijksdaalder in 1583, of weight 29.03 g (448 grains) and 0.885 fineness, and featuring an armored half bust of William the Silent. Friesland, Gelderland, Holland, Kampen, Overijssel, Utrecht, West Friesland, Zeeland, and Zwolle minted armored half bust rijksdaalders until the end of the 17th century.

The pace of depreciation of the small-denomination stuiver quickened from the 1570s, with the leeuwendaalder rising from 32 to 40 stuivers by 1619, and the rijksdaalder from 42 to 50 stuivers. The Amsterdam Wisselbank was then founded in 1608 to establish a stable bank currency with the rijksdaalder of 29.03 g, 0.875 fine (or 25.4 g fine silver) fixed at 50 stuivers, or 2 1/2 gulden.

The bank's success helped the Dutch Republic become Europe's financial center in the 17th century and maintain the reichsthaler as its banking currency unit despite Germany's descent into the chaos of the Thirty Years' War. As a bullion entrepôt of the period, the Netherlands produced reichsthalers for Germany and Scandinavia, and exported leeuwendaalders to the Levant and the Ottoman Empire. These Dutch Thaler coins, depicting a lion, circulated in Bulgaria, Romania and Moldova and gave their name to the respective currencies the Bulgarian lev, Romanian leu, and Moldovan leu.

Lion daalders were in common use in Europe, Africa, the Middle East and in what is now known as the United States. The city of New Amsterdam, currently New York, was founded by the Dutch in the early 17th century. "The Lion Daalder holds an important place in American history as America’s first dollar and the root of the word from where the current currency, the US Dollar, found its name."

By the 18th century, the Spanish-controlled Dutch territories eventually became the Austrian Netherlands. In 1754, it issued the kronenthaler of 29.45 g weight and 0.873 fineness, or 25.71 g fine silver. This coin was adopted by many South German states by the early 19th century.

The term daalder continued to refer to 1 1/2 gulden in currency even after the discontinuation of the 1 1/2 gulden, or 30 stuiver, piece in the 19th century.

The rijksdaalder was also known as the silver ducat, which is still minted for collectors in the Netherlands today.

== Spain and France ==
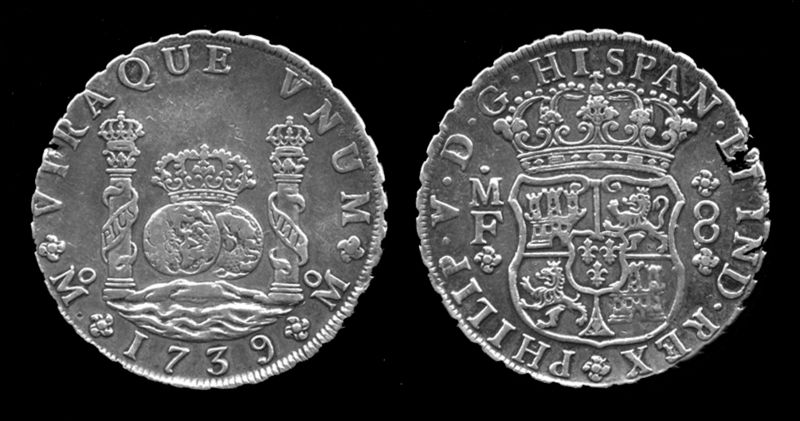
The Spanish eight-real coin, or dollar

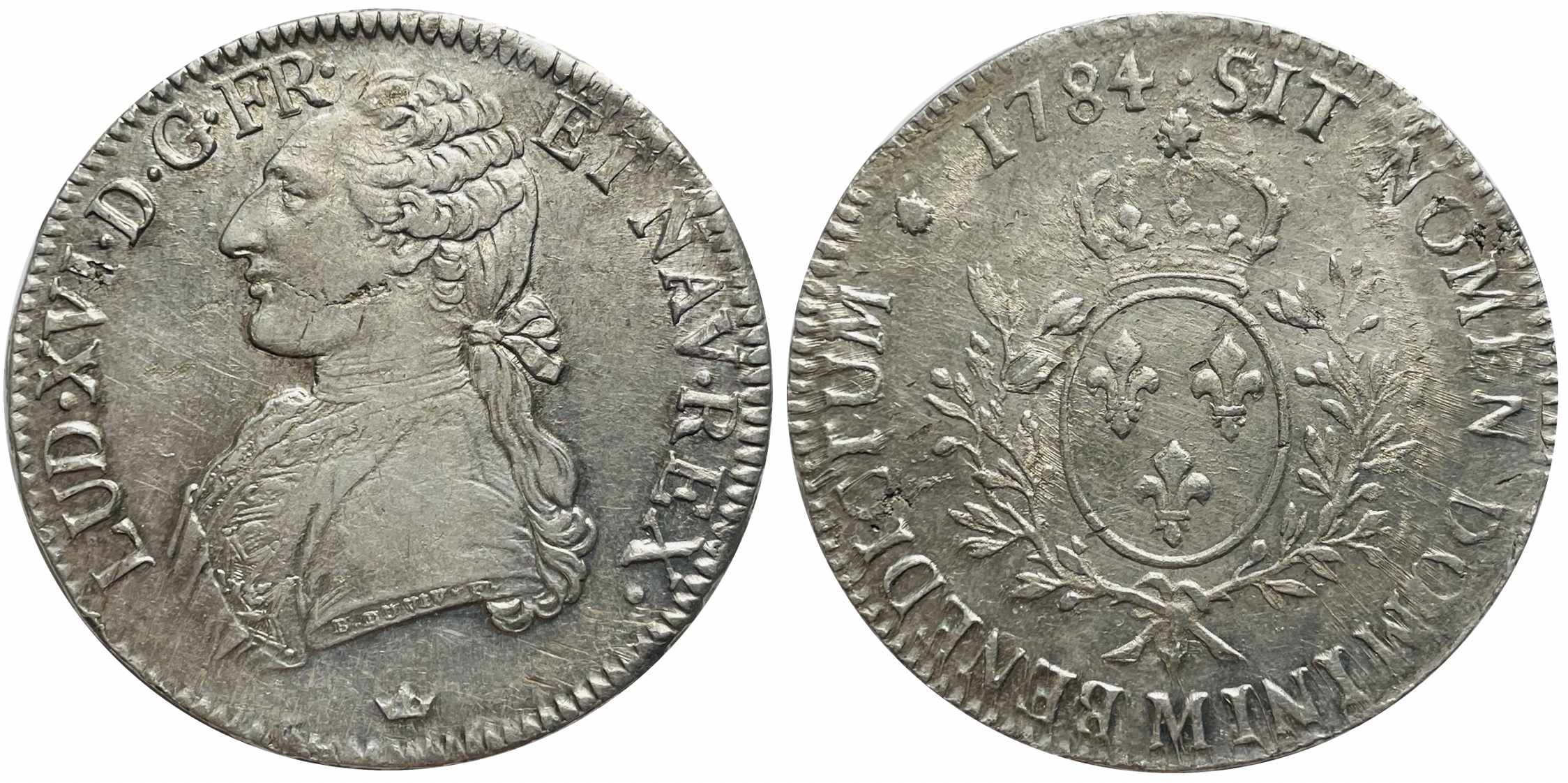
1 écu 1784

The discovery of massive silver supplies in Spanish America in the 1530s enabled the massive minting of Spain's eight-real coin well into the 20th century, weighing 27.47 g, 0.9306 fine. Being of nearly identical weight to the German reichsthaler, British colonists in North America eventually called the Spanish coin the dollar, which became the model for the U.S. dollar and the Canadian dollar.

The rise of German and Spanish dollars in 16th century European trade lessened the demand for French silver francs and testoons. In 1641 King Louis XIII therefore introduced a new Louis d’Argent equal to the Spanish dollar and worth three livres tournois, weighing 27.19 g and 0.917 fine. In 1726, France issued its own thaler coin, the silver écu of six livres with about 26.7 g fine silver; it would also find currency in Southern Germany and Switzerland as the laubthaler. Finally, in 1795, the French franc was established, with the five-franc coin of 25.0 g, 90% fine silver being closest in size to the thalers used elsewhere. The French franc system would be expanded to other countries in the advent of the Latin Monetary Union of 1865.

== Switzerland ==
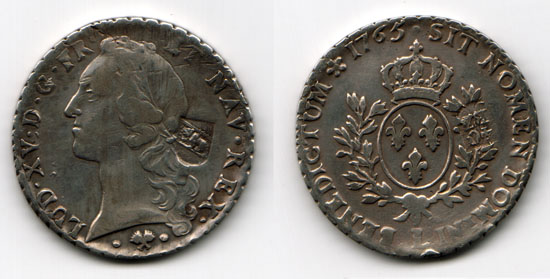
French écu, or laubthaler, stamped "40 BZ" (batzen) in Bern became 4 francs under the Helvetic Republic

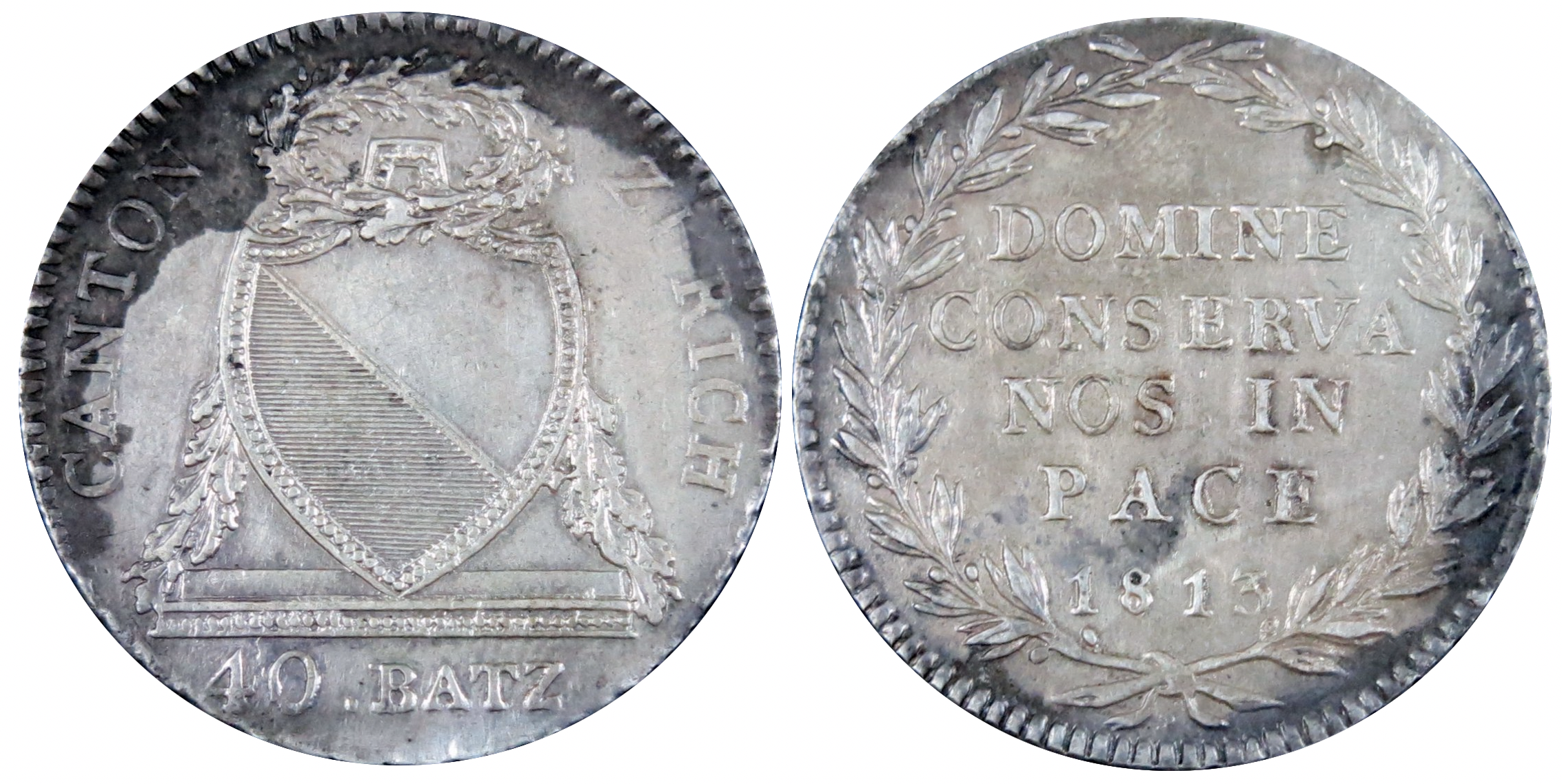
40 batzen minted in Zurich, 1813

The Thirteen Cantons of the Old Swiss Confederacy and their Associates each minted its own coins, with most larger silver coins conforming to established German or French standards. Thaler and half thaler coins were minted by the cities of Zürich (1512), Bern, Lucerne, Zug, Basel, Fribourg, Solothurn, Schaffhausen, St. Gallen and Geneva.

The Reformed cities began to represent "city views" on the obverse of their thalers, as they did not have the option to represent either patron saints or ruling princes. The first city view thaler of Zürich was minted in 1651 (the so-called Vögelitaler).

By the 18th century, Bern and many Western Swiss cantons adopted the French écu, or laubthaler, of 26.7 g fine silver as its most widely used thaler, valued at four livres (francs) or 40 batzen of Bern. In 1798 this system was adopted by the Helvetic Confederation, with the first Swiss franc equal to 1/4 écu.

Eventual transition to this first new Swiss franc stalled in the 19th century while public preference shifted to the South German Kronenthaler of 25.71 g fine silver, valued at 3.9 francs or 39 batzen. In 1850 Switzerland established the modern-day Swiss franc at par with the French franc, with 40 Swiss francs exchanged for seven kronenthaler. The five-franc coin of 25.0 g, 90% fine silver became the coin with the closest value to the different historical thalers.

== Scandinavia ==
The name thaler was introduced to Scandinavia as daler. The first Swedish daler coins were minted in 1534. The Norwegian speciedaler was minted from 1560. Later Scandinavian daler coins included the Swedish riksdaler (1604) and the Danish rigsdaler (1625). In the early 19th century, these countries introduced their modern currency based on the daler unit. In Norway, speciedaler was chosen as the currency name in 1816.

These currencies in Denmark and Sweden were replaced by the Danish krone and Swedish krona in 1873, the new currencies introduced by the Scandinavian Monetary Union. Norway joined the Monetary Union and introduced the Norwegian krone in 1876.

== 19th-century Germany ==
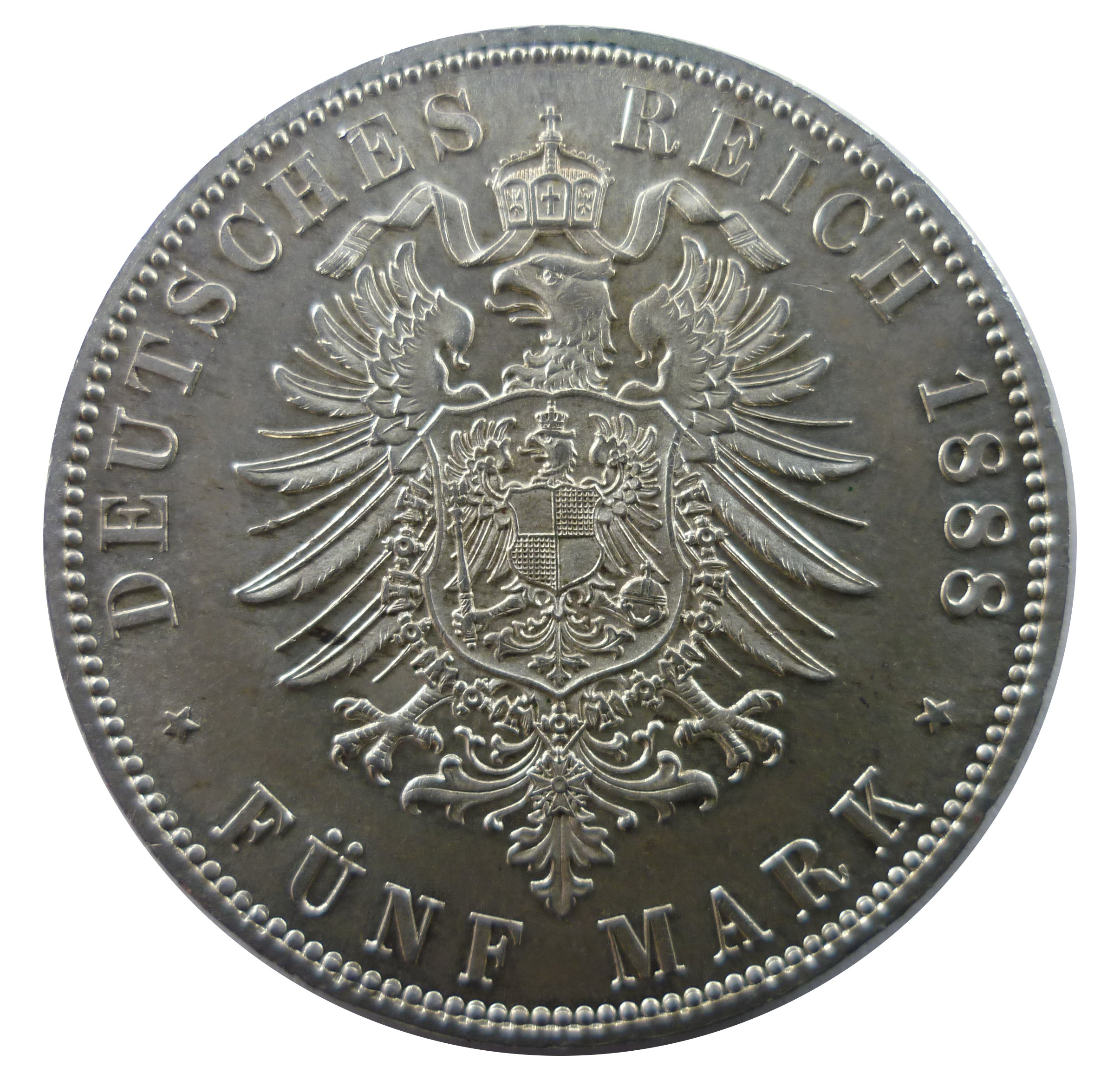
German 5 Mark coin (1888)

At the beginning of the 19th century the South German states valued the Conventionsthaler at 2.4 South German gulden, or 9.744 grams fine silver, per gulden. Afterwards, however, they began to mint the Kronenthaler valued at 2.7 gulden - hence a reduced fine silver content for the gulden at 9.52 g. In 1837, the Prussian thaler was fixed at 1 3/4 South German gulden - hence 9.545 g fine silver per gulden.

The North German thaler, valued at 3/4 a Conventionsthaler, or 13 1/3 to a Cologne Mark, fine silver at the start of the 19th century, was revalued in the 1840s at par with the Prussian thaler, at 14 to a Mark, though with varying subdivisions. In 1857, the Vereinsthaler, worth one North German thaler, or 1 3/4 South German gulden, was adopted as the standard coin by most German states as well as in the Habsburg Empire. Vereinsthalers were issued until 1871 in Germany and 1867 in Austria.

Within the new German Empire, silver vereinsthaler coins remained unlimited legal tender at a value of three German gold marks until 1908 when they were withdrawn and demonetized. Some old countermarked thalers circulated as emergency coinage in Germany during the inflationary period following its defeat in the First World War.

The Maria Theresa thaler, the most famous example of the Conventionsthaler minted from 1751, enjoyed a special role as trade currency and continued to be minted long after the death of Maria Theresa in 1780, with coins minted after her death always showing the year 1780. Francis Joseph of Austria declared it an official trade coinage in 1857 just before it lost legal tender status in Austria following issue of the Vereinsthaler. The Maria Theresa taler became the de facto currency of the Ethiopian Empire in the late 18th century, with the Ethiopian birr introduced at par with this taler, and it continued to be in use into the 20th century in the Horn of Africa, Eastern Africa and India and throughout much of the Arabian Peninsula.

== Legacy ==
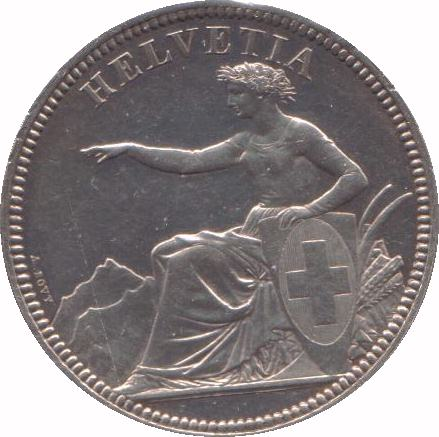
Swiss 5 francs coin, 25.0 grams, 90% silver

Though various silver thaler coins were minted in most of Europe until the 1870s, these coins were more often counted in non-thaler currency units like Dutch or Austrian guilders, French francs, Spanish reales, etc. By the mid-19th century the thaler (or reichsthaler, rigsdaler) was still the currency unit used in the North German Confederation and Scandinavia. By 1875 the thaler itself disappeared as currency unit in Europe upon adoption of the gold standard.

Nonetheless, use of the thaler as currency continued outside Europe in the form of the U.S. dollar and the Canadian dollar, the Mexican peso and the various pesos of Spanish America, and the Ethiopian birr. Thaler (and its linguistic variants) would also survive as the informal name of coins equivalent to the historical coin, like the German three-mark coin, the Dutch 2 1/2-gulden coin, the five-franc coins of the Latin Monetary Union (among them France, Belgium, Switzerland), and the Greek five-drachma coin (τάληρο, taliro).

Thaler-sized coins minted to late-19th-century standards would be minted until 1914 in Mexico and in most of Europe, until 1928 in Switzerland, and until 1934 in the United States. Henceforth thaler-sized silver coins would be minted as bullion or numismatic pieces, among them:

- The Maria Theresa thaler trade coin
- Modern silver commemorative Talers minted in German-speaking Europe; e.g. the Swiss Schützentaler, the Swiss Helvetia-Taler, and the Austrian Haller-Taler.
- The American Silver Eagle, which at 1 troy ounce (31 g) fine silver is actually heavier than the original silver dollar.

Unrelated to specific coins, thaler survives in various modern currency names, in the form dollar in twenty-three currencies used in countries including Australia, Canada, Hong Kong, New Zealand and the United States of America, and also in the Samoan tālā and the Slovenian tolar (before adoption of the euro).

== Chronology of thaler development ==
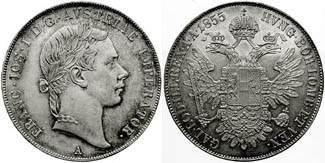
Austrian Vereinsthaler (1855)

- 1486: Sigismund of Tirol issues his 31.93 g Guldengroschen of 60 Kreuzers and .9375 fineness.
- 1493: Switzerland issues its first Guldengroschen at Bern.
- 1499: Hungary issues the first Guldiner/Guldengroschen. It is the earliest year of issue with Arabic numerals on the coins in Hungary.
- 1500: The first German Guldengroschen is issued from Saxony weighing 29.232 grams, or eight to a Cologne Mark.
- 1518: The first coin actually called a "Thaler" is minted in Joachimsthal, Bohemia, Holy Roman Empire, also weighing 29.232 g.
- 1524: The money ordinance Reichsmünzordnung issued at Esslingen is the first attempt at a standard currency system for the Holy Roman Empire. It fixed the weight of the guldengroschen weight at 29.232 g (or 1/8th a Cologne Mark, or 233.856 g), its fineness at 0.9375, and proposed it be divided into 21 groschen or 60 kreuzer.
- 1534: Saxony and Bohemia alter the fineness of their guldiners (or one-guilder coin) down from .9375 purity to .903 while maintaining the same coin weight, thus lowering the actual amount of pure silver in the coin. This made the imperial Guldengroschen worth more than the locally issued guldiner.
- 1551: A new money ordinance is decreed in Augsburg that lowered the guldengroschen's fineness to 0.882 but raised its weight to 31.18 g. Many German states begin to accept this standard guldengroschen, but valued higher at 24 groschen or 72 kreuzer, further reinforcing its separation from the accounting gulden defined as only 60 kreuzer. A huge variety of other accounting subdivisions of the coin prevailed throughout the Empire.
- 1559: After the death of the Holy Roman Emperor Charles V, yet another money ordinance is decreed at Augsburg, which discontinued the 72-kreuzer guldengroschen (minted at 8.533 to a Cologne Mark of fine silver) in favor of a 60-kreuzer "guldiner", or one-gulden coin, minted at 10.24 to a Mark.
- 1566: Protestations over the disappearance of the guldengroschen resulted in the issuance of the Reichsthaler (known later as the Speciesthaler), of weight 29.232 g and fineness 0.889 (hence, 9 Specie Reichsthalers issued to a Cologne Mark of fine silver). While modestly lighter than the guldengroschen, its public acceptance at the same price of 24 groschen or 72 kreuzer (or 10.8 guilders to a Mark) doomed the then-underpriced guldiner.
- 1618: The Reichsthaler was valued at 24 groschen, or 90 kreuzer, or 1 1/2 gulden on the eve of the Thirty Years' War of 1618–1648 and the Kipper und Wipper financial crisis which destroyed Germany's various monetary systems.
- 1667: An agreement made at the Abbey of Zinna between Saxony, Brandenburg, and Brunswick-Lüneburg to help make the minting of small coins more economical than could be done under the old Augsburg ordinances led to the creation of a lower-valued Thaler, still worth 1 1/2 gulden or 90 kreuzer, but equal to 6/7 of the original Speciethaler (or 10 1/2 Zinnaische thalers to a Cologne Mark of fine silver). Northern European states like Denmark, Hamburg and Lübeck acceded to this convention.
- 1690: The Leipzig Money Convention met to deal with the poor quality of coinage in Saxony, Brandenburg, and Brunswick, as well as the limited acceptance of the 1667 Zinnaische standard. The agreement reached was to reduce the North German thaler further to 3/4 the Speciethaler, or 12 Leipzig thalers minted from a Cologne Mark of fine silver. The Leipzig standard eventually prevailed all over the Empire, with a variety of subdivisions still used by the different states for this thaler: 1 1/2 gulden, 90 kreuzer, 24 gutegroschen, 36 mariengroschen, etc.
- 1750: This year saw yet another reduction in weight in the areas controlled by Prussia, Hesse, and Brunswick-Wolfenbüttel down to just 22.272 g and a .750 fineness. 14 Prussian thalers were minted from a Cologne mark of fine silver.
- 1754: The monetary agreement between Austria and Bavaria in 1753 replaced the original Speciethaler by a new Conventionsthaler, with ten to a Cologne Mark of fine silver (or 23.3856 g). Its weight was 28.06 g with a fineness of .833. This Conventionsthaler was worth 1 1/3 North German thalers, or 1.4 Prussian thalers, or 2 Austro-Hungarian florins, or 2.4 South German gulden. Over time this coin would spread into a large portion of central and southern Germany but not in Scandinavia.
- From 1820: The Kronenthaler (a thaler with three or four crowns between the Burgundy cross), a coin first issued in 1754 by the Austrian Empire for use in the Austrian Netherlands (present-day Belgium), became widely adopted by various Southern German that the rate of to 2.7 South German gulden. The kronenthaler had a weight of 29.45 g and a fineness of .873.
- From 1837: the Prussia-led Zollverein customs union led to a more vigorous transition into the Prussian currency standard, with North German thalers being replaced by lower-valued Prussian thalers worth 14 to a Cologne Mark of fine silver (or 16.704 g), and with each thaler then divided into 30 silbergroschen. The Prussian thaler was also fixed at 1 3/4 South German gulden.
- 1857: The Vienna monetary contract finally eliminates the Cologne Mark as a standard against which the silver coinage of Austria and Germany are reckoned, replacing it with a simple tariff of 500 g fine silver. 30 Vereinsthalers are set to be minted from this 500 g standard (hence 16.67 g fine silver, or weight 18.52 g .900 fine). The Vereinsthaler was made equal to 1 1/2 Austro-Hungarian florins, 1 3/4 South German gulden, 30 silbergroschen, and other subdivisions.
- 1873: The gold standard was adopted by the newly unified German Empire, with the silver Vereinsthaler remaining unlimited legal tender at three gold marks despite its bullion value dropping below three gold marks over the next several years.
- 1908: The Vereinsthaler was officially demonetised in Germany and made worth only bullion value.

== See also ==
- Ausbeutetaler
