= Mecklenburg thaler =

The Thaler was the currency of the two Duchies, later Grand Duchies, of Mecklenburg-Schwerin and Mecklenburg-Strelitz until 1857. It was replaced the Mecklenburg Vereinsthaler at par. From the 1750s it was identical to the Hanoverian thaler at 1/12 a Cologne Mark of fine silver. From 1848, it was equal to the Prussian Thaler at 1/14 a Mark.

The thaler was subdivided into 48 Schillinge, each of 12 Pfenninge.
