= Bremen thaler =

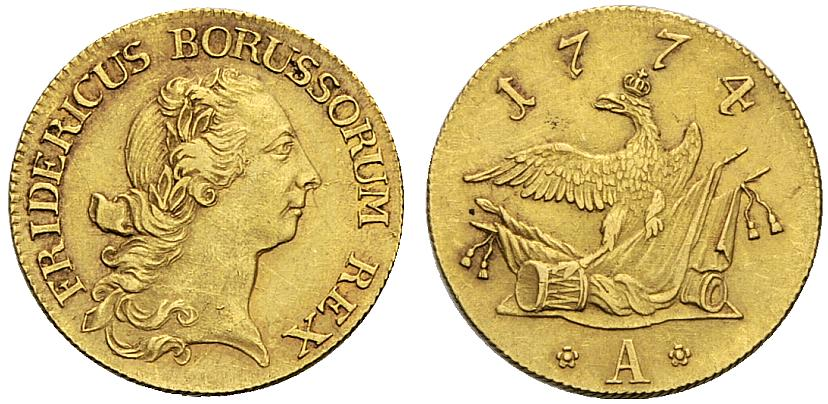
Bremen accepted the Friedrich d'or gold pistole for 5 thalers.

The Thaler was the currency of the Free Hanseatic City of Bremen until 1873, when Germany adopted the gold mark (ℳ). It was divided into 72 Grote, each of 5 Schwaren. While initially identical to the North German thaler before the 1750s, it was the only currency to maintain the gold standard of 5 thalers to a Friedrich d'or pistole from the 1750s until 1873, long after all other states adopted the Conventionsthaler.

== North German Thaler Gold ==
After implementation of the 1690 Leipzig currency standard the majority of the North German states defined the Reichsthaler currency as 1/12th a Cologne Mark of fine silver or 19.488 g. The gold-silver price ratio dropped, however, in the mid-18th century (down to 14.5 in France after 1726), leading many states to reissue their Reichsthaler currencies in cheaper Thaler Gold.

By the 1730s the gold florin of 2.5036 g was valued at 2 thaler; hence each Thaler Gold was worth 1.2518 g gold or 18.15 g silver at France's gold ratio of 14.5 (vs 19.488 g per silver thaler). In 1741 Frederick the Great introduced the 6-gram fine gold Friedrich d'or pistole worth 5 thalers; the Thaler Gold became even cheaper at 1.2 g gold or 17.4 g silver.

This unofficial Thaler Gold standard was replaced by the Conventionsthaler standard in most of Northern Germany after 1754, restoring its silver footing at 13 1/3 thalers to the Cologne Mark, or 17.5392 g. Only Bremen stayed on the Thaler Gold standard until German Reunification in 1871.

== Bremen Thaler Gold ==
Bremen initially responded to the emergence of the Thaler Gold in 1740 by lowering their thaler's standard to 2/3rd the Reichsthaler specie coin or 2/27 a Cologne mark of silver, but was not able to issue currency to this standard. On the other hand, French and North German gold pistoles were easily available and of stable quality & value. Hence Bremen accepted the gold standard at 5 Thaler Gold to the 6.0-gram pistole, and retained it until 1873 even after the other North German states switched to the Conventionsthaler.

In 1863 Bremen valued the German gold krone, containing 10 grams of fine gold, at 8.4 Thalers, hence an equivalence of 1 4/21 grams of fine gold to the Thaler. In 1873, the Thaler was replaced by the mark (ℳ). As the mark is also fixed to gold with 1 gram equal to 2.79ℳ, an exact conversion was carried out with 1 Thaler = 3 9/28 mark (ℳ).
