= Conventionsthaler =

Coin

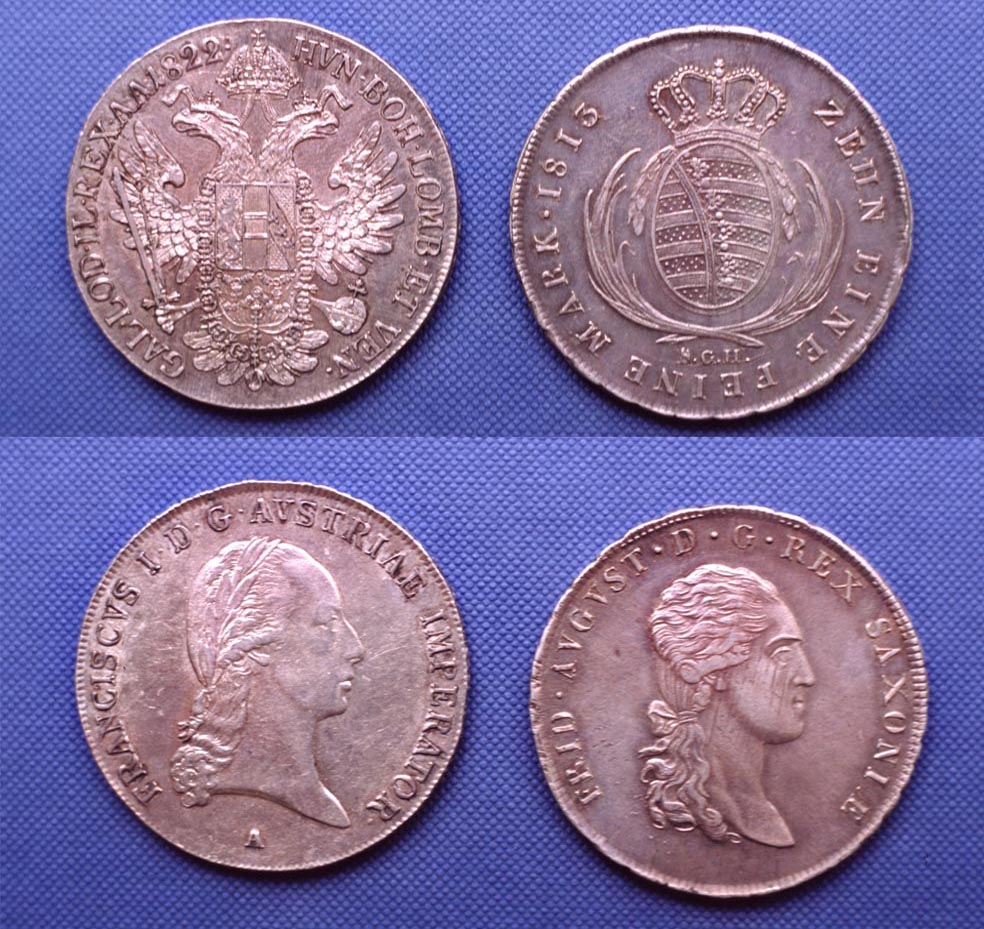
Konventionsthalers: Francis I, Emperor of Austria, 1822; Frederick Augustus I, King of Saxony, 1813, Dresden Mint

The Conventionstaler or Konventionstaler ("Convention thaler"), (Note: In German the name was spelt –thaler until 1901.) was a standard silver coin in the Austrian Empire and the southern German states of the Holy Roman Empire from the mid-18th to early 19th-centuries. Its most famous example is the Maria Theresa thaler which is still minted today. The Conventionsgulden was equivalent to a 1/2 Conventionsthaler.

== History ==
The Austrian Empire introduced the Convention currency standard in 1754 to replace the Leipzig standard of 1690, after a drop in the gold–silver price ratio from 15 to 14.5 in the 1730s unleashed a flood of cheaper thalers defined in gold. The Leipzig standard defined the North German thaler currency unit at 3/4 the Reichsthaler specie of 25.984 g, or 19.488 g fine silver. In contrast, in 1741 the gold Friedrich d'or pistole of 6.05 g fine gold was issued for 5 thalers. This resulted in a cheaper Thaler Gold worth 1.21 g fine gold or 1.21 × 14.5 = 17.545 g fine silver.

The Conventionsthaler (10-Thaler standard, 23.386 g silver) contained 1/10 of a Cologne Mark and originally corresponded to exactly two Conventionsgulden (20-Gulden standard, 11.693 g silver), which meant that it could be one and the same coin as a double gulden. Consequently, half a Conventionsthaler was referred to as a gulden. However, this parity did not exist with the inferior south German lower denomination coins where the Conventionsthaler was worth two gulden and 12 kreuzer. The gulden coinage standard was therefore adjusted in 1760.

The Conventionsthaler was introduced as the successor to the Reichsthaler on 7 November 1750 in the Austrian crown lands. By the Konventionsfuß treaty of 20 September 1753, it was also introduced into the Bavarian Imperial Circle. Gradually it spread to southern Germany and Saxony. The last German Conventionsthaler was minted there in 1838. In Austria they were minted until 1856 before being superseded under the terms of the 1857 Vienna Minting Treaty.

The Conventionsthaler was the standard thaler coin issued by many mints in the Holy Roman Empire to the 20-Gulden standard of the Minting Convention of 1753, according to which 10 coins were minted for each 5/6 of fine mark silver (= 1 Cologne mark ≈ 233 g of silver). For this reason, the inscription "X EINE FEINE MARK" is written on many Conventionsthalers. Its fine weight is therefore 23.385 grammes of silver according to the Cologne mark weight standard.

The Conventionsthaler was worth 32 groschen, in contrast to the Reichstaler, which was reckoned at 24 groschen. It was therefore a 4/3 (counting) Reichstaler.

The Conventionsthaler succeeded the Reichsthaler specie (containing 25.984 g fine silver) as the standard coin in most of the Holy Roman Empire, with a variety of subdivisions being used:

- 1 Conventionsthaler = 2 Austro-Hungarian florin, each florin equal to 20 groschen or 60 kreuzer.
- 1 Conventionsthaler = 2.4 South German gulden, each also containing 60 kreuzer.
- 1 Conventionsthaler = 1 1/3 North German thaler currency unit, each of 24 groschen.

Thus, converted to the theoretical (counting) Reichstaler of the old German Empire, which was worth 24 groschen, the Conventionsthaler corresponded to a 13 1/3-thaler standard in relation to the Cologne mark. Meanwhile, the Prussian 'new' Reichstaler, minted in real terms from 1750 onwards, corresponded to a 14-thaler standard developed by Johann Philipp Graumann. So it was lighter and therefore worth less. The new Reichstaler superseded the Conventionsthaler with the Dresden Coinage Treaty of 1838, according to which, in the countries of the German Customs Union (German: Deutscher Zollverein), 2 thaler minted to the 14-thaler standard equalled 3 1/2 gulden to the 24 1/2-gulden standard.

During the early 19th century, the Conventionsthaler of 1 1/3 thaler (17.5392 g fine silver per thaler) was superseded in Northern Germany by the Prussian thaler containing 1/14 of a Cologne mark or 16.70 g fine silver, while the Conventionsthaler of 2.4 South German gulden (9.73 g fine silver per gulden) was superseded by the 2.7-gulden Kronenthaler containing 9.524 g fine silver per gulden.

== Subdivisions of the Conventionsthaler in Saxony around 1770 ==
- 4/3 thaler (Conventionsthaler) 10 to 1 fine mark of silver, Kurantmünze ("currency coin" (Note: A Kurantmünze is type of currency coin, i.e. one whose value is based on its intrinsic worth and so usually made of gold or silver.)
- 2/3 thaler (Conventionsgulden) 20 to 1 fine mark of silver, Kurantmünze
- 1/3 thaler (8 groschen) 40 to 1 fine mark of silver, Kurantmünze
- 1/6 thaler (4 groschen), 80 to 1 fine mark of silver, Kurantmünze
- 1/12 thaler (2 groschen), 160 to 1 fine mark, silver Kurantmünze
- 1/24 thaler (1 groschen), 320 to 1 fine mark, silver Kurantmünze
- 1/48 thaler (6 pfennig), billon (alloy) Scheidemünze ("fiat coin" (Note: A Scheidemünze is a type of fiat money; a circulation coin of lower value than its intrinsic worth.))
- 1/240 thaler (1 pfennig), copper Scheidemünze
- 1/480 thaler (1 heller), copper Scheidemünze

== See also ==
- Reichsthaler
- North German thaler
- Austro-Hungarian gulden
- South German gulden
- Kronenthaler
