= Friedrich d'or =

Prussian gold coin

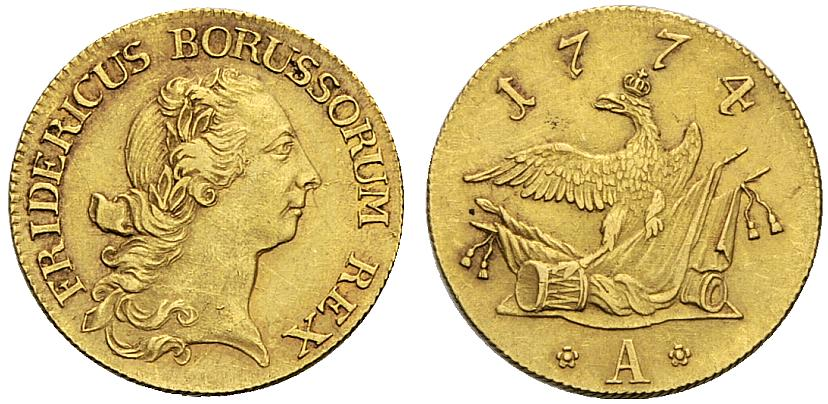
Friedrich d'or of 1774

The Friedrich d'or was a Prussian gold coin (pistole) nominally worth 5 silver Prussian thalers. It was subsequently copied by other North German states under their own rulers' names (August-, Friedrich-August-, Christian d'or) and valued at 4.8-5 silver North German thalers.

It was used from 1741 to 1855 as a regularly-issued gold trade coin at this time, and was traded at a small premium or discount to its face value of five thalers in silver standard currency (silberkurantgeld) used in the stock exchanges and elsewhere. Around 1780, for example, the Saxon August d'or was quoted at 116 to 120 groschen sächsischen silberkurantgeldes (4.83 to 5 thalers, Saxon silver currency), with a maximum discount of 4 groschen (0.17 thaler). In the 19th century it usually had a low premium.

Prussian purchase contracts or bonds payable in 5-thaler gold pistoles (rather than silver currency) were noted as payable in "XX thalers, preußisch Courant" or "Friedrich d'or".

== History ==
Modelled on the Spanish doubloon and French Louis d'or, the forerunner of the Friedrich d'or was the Wilhelm d'or. It was first minted in 1741 by Frederick II. It was continued by his successors Frederick William II, Frederick William III and Frederick William IV, until 1855. From 1747 a double Friedrich d'or was minted, and a half Friedrich d'or from 1749. Its fine weight sank in 1770 from 6.05 to 6.03 grams.

The Friedrich d'or pistole of 5 thalers was issued when the ratio of gold to silver price dropped from 15 to 14.5 in the first half of the 18th century, making it cheaper to repay thaler-denominated obligations in gold. At 6.05 g fine gold per pistole, each thaler was worth 1.21g fine gold & 1.21 x14.5 = 17.545 g fine silver, cheaper than the prevailing standard of 19.488 g fine silver. Even at the pistole's lower value of 4.8 thalers, the thaler's silver equivalent of 18.3 g is still below the standard.

What followed was the North German thaler's silver standard lowered after 1750 to 13 1/3 per Cologne Mark, or 17.539 g fine silver (in Prussia, 14 per Mark or 16.704 g). When the gold-silver ratio rose again, the pistole then traded at 5 thalers plus an agio or premium. The pistole's standard varied slightly; at best 35 to a Cologne Mark of gold 130/144 fine, or 6.032 g fine gold; at worst 35 1/6 to a Mark 129/144 fine, or 5.957 g fine gold.

Only Bremen stayed on the Thaler Gold standard of 5 thalers per pistole until German Reunification in 1871.

== Appearance ==
On the obverse of the Friedrich d'or was the king's head, and on the reverse was an eagle standing on its shield.

== See also ==
- Ephraimiten

== Bibliography ==
- Fred Reinfeld: A Catalogue of the World's Most Popular Coins, (Sterling, New York, 1956) (ISBN 4-87187-800-7)
