= Hanoverian thaler =

Historical currency of the Kingdom of Hanover

The Thaler was the currency of the Electorate, later Kingdom of Hanover until 1857. It was identical to the North German thaler except from 1754 to 1834 when it was worth 1/12 a Cologne Mark of fine silver (versus the Conventions standard of 3/40 a Mark). It was subdivided into 36 Mariengroschen, each of 8 Pfennig.

Between 1807 and 1813, the Westphalian thaler (equal to the Hanoverian Thaler) and the Westphalian frank circulated in Hannover.

In 1834, the Thaler was revised in silver content to equal to the Prussian thaler at 1/14 a Cologne Mark. The Thaler was replaced at par in 1857 by the Hanoverian vereinsthaler.
