= Westphalian thaler =

Currency

The thaler was a currency of the Kingdom of Westphalia between 1807 and 1813. From 1808, it circulated alongside the frank. The thaler was equal to those of the preceding states, including the Hannovarian thaler. It was subdivided into 36 Mariengroschen, each of 8 Pfennig.
