= German mark (1871) =

German currency from 1871 to 1914

Mark (German)
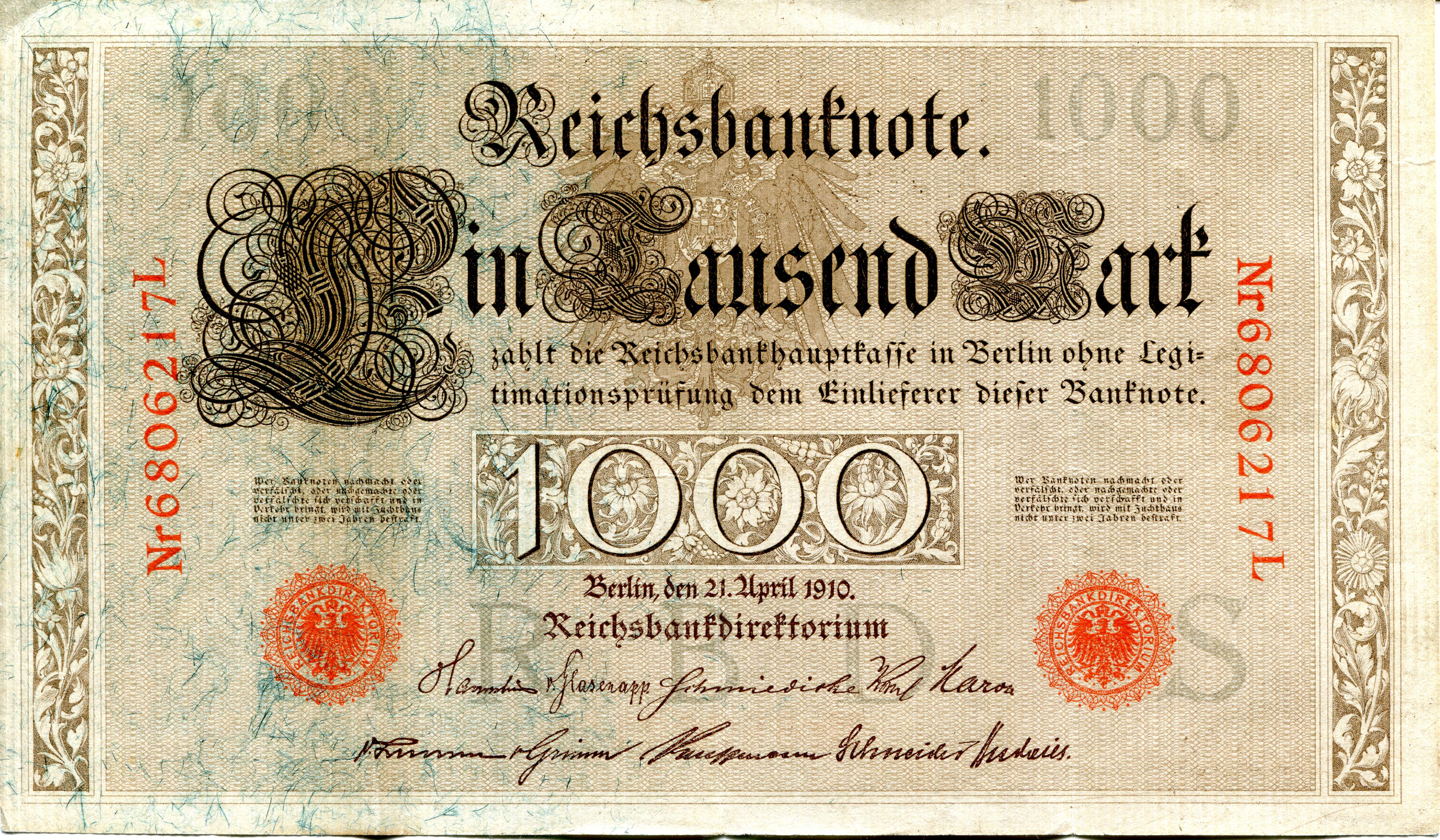
German 1,000-mark banknote from 1910
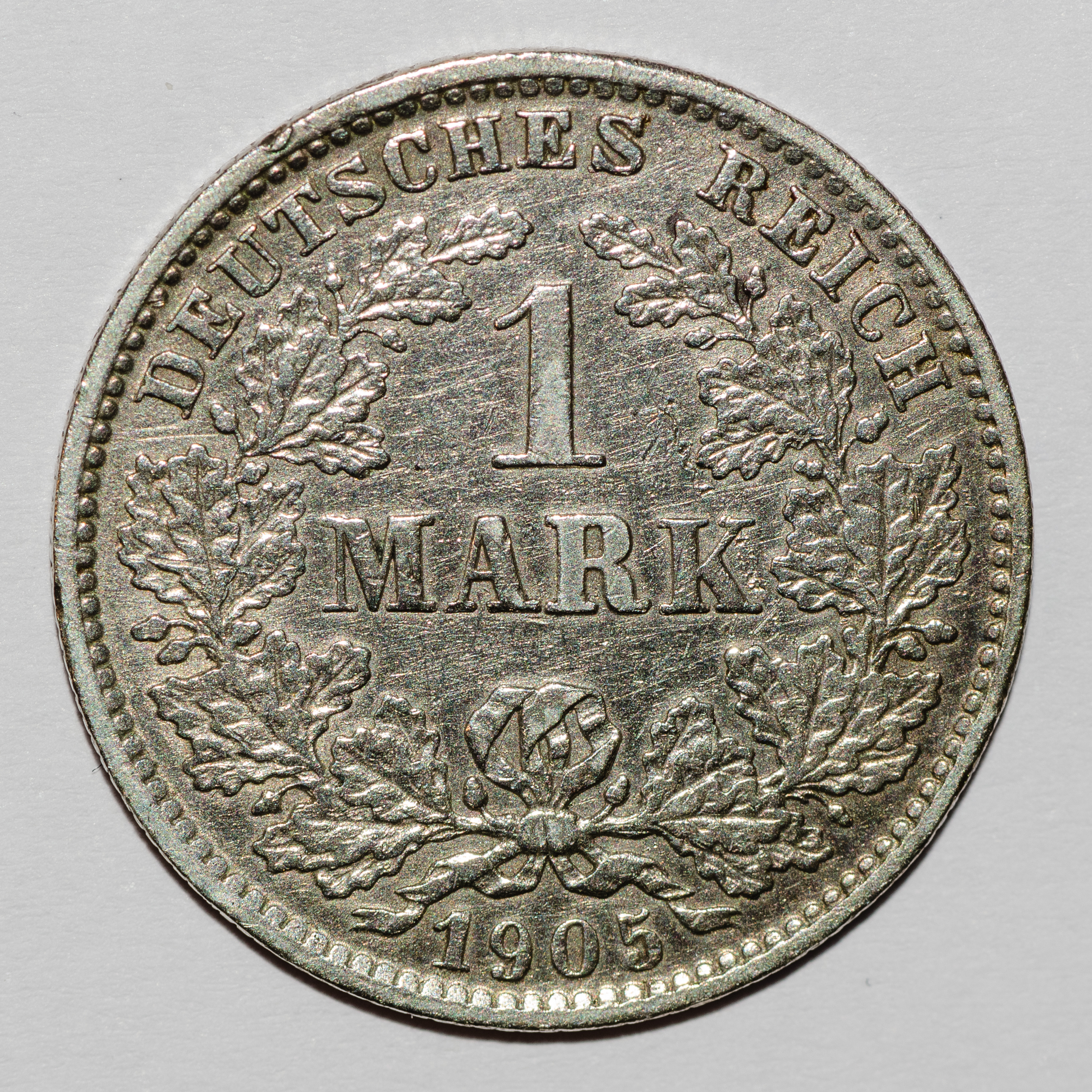
1-mark coin from 1905

Units of account
- Plural: Mark
- Symbol: ℳ︁
- Subunit
- 1/100: Pfennig
- Plural
- Pfennig: Pfennig
- Symbol
- Pfennig: ₰

Denominations
- Banknotes: 5, 10, 20, 50, 100, 1000 Mark
- Coins: 1, 2, 5, 10, 20, 25 Pfennig; 1/2, 1, 2, 3, 5, 10, 20 Mark

Demographics
- User(s): German Empire • German colonial empire

Issuance
- Central bank: Reichsbank
- This infobox shows the latest status before this currency was rendered obsolete.

The German mark (German: Goldmark [ˈɡɔltmaʁk]; sign: ℳ︁) was the currency of the German Empire, which spanned from 1871 to 1918. The mark was paired with the pfennig (₰) as its minor unit; 100 pfennigs were equivalent to 1 mark. The mark was on the gold standard from 1871 to 1914, but like most nations during World War I, the German Empire removed the gold backing in August 1914, and gold coins ceased to circulate.

After the fall of the Empire due to the November Revolution of 1918, the mark was succeeded by the Weimar Republic's mark, derisively referred to as the Papiermark (lit. 'Paper mark') due to hyperinflation in the Weimar Republic from 1918 to 1923.

== History ==
The introduction of the German mark in 1873 was the culmination of decades-long efforts to unify the various currencies used by the German Confederation. The Zollverein unified in 1838 the Prussian and South German currencies at a fixed rate of 1 Prussian thaler = 1 3/4 South German gulden = 16.704 g fine silver. A larger currency convention in 1857 replaced the Prussian thaler with the Vereinsthaler of 16 2/3 g fine silver, equivalent to 1 North German thaler, 1 1/2 Austro-Hungarian florins, or 1 3/4 South German gulden.

The law of 4 December 1871 named one tenth of a new imperial gold coin a mark, divided it into 100 pfennigs and authorized gold coins of 10 and 20 marks. The Coinage Act of 9 July 1873 made the mark the unit of account of the Reich gold currency, which was to replace the state currencies. An imperial ordinance of 22 September 1875 set 1 January 1876 as the date on which the Reich currency came into force throughout Germany.

The transition to this system proceeded further due to German unification in 1871 as well as monetary conventions from 1865 to 1870 expressing a desire to move to the gold standard. For this system, a new unit, the mark, was proposed; it was equal to a drittelthaler, or 1/3 Vereinsthaler, and also to 1/2 of the Austrian gulden, but was decimally divided into 100 pfennigs instead of the existing 120 pfennigs. The new mark of 5 g fine silver was equivalent to 100/279 g fine gold. With 5 billion gold francs (equivalent to 4.05 billion gold marks) secured from France at the end of the Franco-Prussian War, the new currency was launched in 1873 in the form of gold 10-mark and 20-mark coins as well as limited legal-tender silver marks and copper pfennigs. The German Empire's conversion to the gold standard led to its adoption in the rest of Europe and North America and to the Latin Monetary Union's transition from bimetallism to a gold standard.

The government withdrew old silver coins, melted them and sold the bullion. Because the silver price had fallen and losses were mounting, the government suspended the sales on 19 May 1879.

Despite the Vereinsthaler being a silver standard currency, German one-thaler pieces remained unlimited legal tender for 3 gold marks until 30 September 1907. They ceased to be legal tender on 1 October 1907, but Reich and state treasuries continued to accept or exchange them at three marks until 30 September 1908. The South German gulden of 4/7 Vereinsthaler was converted to 1 5/7 or 1.71 gold marks. The gold-based Bremen thaler was converted directly to the mark at a rate of 1 Thaler gold = 3 9/28 or 3.32 marks. The Hamburg mark courant or currency was converted at 1 mark = 1.2 Imperial marks, and the Hamburg mark banco of the Bank of Hamburg was converted at 1 mark banco = 1.5 Imperial marks.

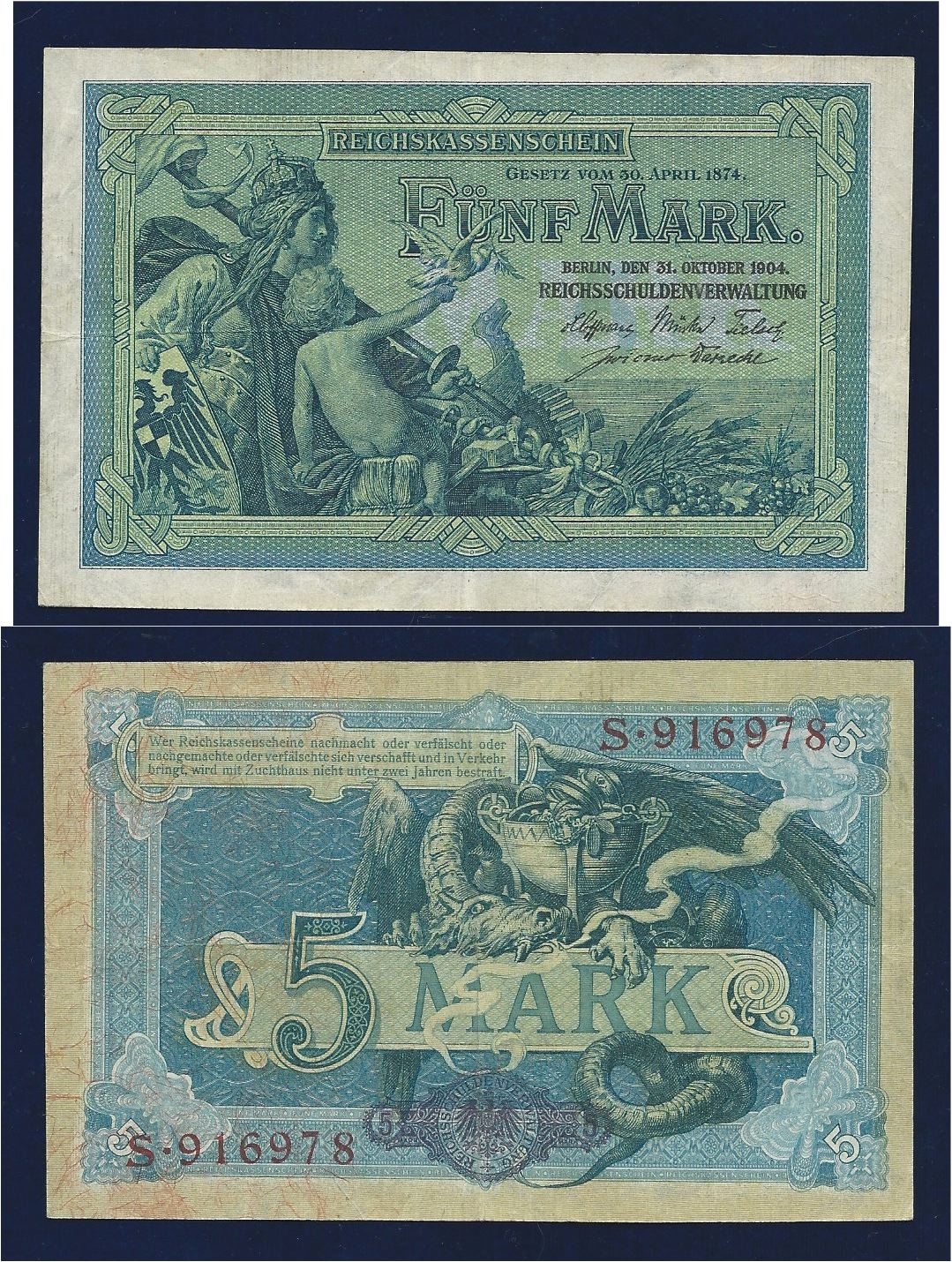
German 5-mark Art Nouveau banknote from 1904, designed by Alexander Zick

From 1 January 1876 onwards, the mark and vereinsthaler became the only legal tender. Before 1914, the mark was on a gold standard with 2790 marks equal to 1 kilogram of pure gold (1 mark = 358 mg). The term Goldmark was created later to retrospectively distinguish it from the Papiermark (paper mark), which suffered a serious loss of value through hyperinflation following World War I during hyperinflation in the Weimar Republic. For comparison, from 1900 to 1933, the United States also adhered to a gold standard, with the gold dollar containing 1.50463 grams (23.22 grains) fine gold; it was therefore worth 4.198 gold marks. The monetary hegemon of the time when the gold mark was in use, however, was the pound sterling, with the sovereign (£1) being valued at 20.43 gold marks.

World War I reparations owed by Germany were stated in gold marks in 1921, 1929 and 1931; this was the victorious Allies' response to their fear that vanquished Germany might try to pay off the obligation in paper currency. The actual amount of reparations that Germany was obliged to pay out was not the 132 billion marks cited in the London Schedule of 1921 but rather the 50 billion marks stipulated in the A and B Bonds. The actual total payout from 1920 to 1931 (when payments were suspended indefinitely) was 20 billion German gold marks, worth about US$5 billion or £1 billion. Most of that money came from loans from New York bankers.

Following the Nazi seizure of power in 1933, payments of reparations were officially abandoned. West Germany after World War II did not resume payment of reparations as such, but did resume the payment of debt that Germany had acquired in the inter-war period to finance its reparation payments, paying off the principal on those debts by 1980. The interest on those debts was paid off on 3 October 2010, the 20th anniversary of German reunification.

== Coins ==
Gold mark coins (1/2, 1, 5 and 20 mark)

Gold mark coins (1/2, 1, 5 and 20 mark)

Coins of denominations between 1 pfennig and 1 mark were issued in standard designs for the whole empire, whilst those above 1 mark were issued by the individual states, using a standard design for the reverses (the Reichsadler, the eagle insignia of the German Empire) with a design specific to the state on the obverse, generally a portrait of the monarch of the kingdom or duchy (and not that of the emperor), while the free cities of Bremen, Hamburg, and Lübeck each used its own coat of arms. Occasionally commemorative coins were minted, in which case the obverse and (much more rarely) the reverse designs might depart from the usual pictorial standards. Many of the smaller states issued coins in very small numbers. Also, in general, all states' coinage became very limited after the First World War began. Well-preserved examples of such low-mintage coins can be rare and valuable. The Principality of Lippe was the only state not to issue any gold coins in this period.

=== Base metal coins ===
- 1 pfennig (copper: 1873–1916, aluminium: 1916–1918)
- 2 pfennig (copper: 1873–1916)
- 5 pfennig (cupro-nickel: 1873–1915, iron: 1915–1922)
- 10 pfennig (cupro-nickel: 1873–1916, iron and zinc: 1915–1922)
- 20 pfennig (cupro-nickel, 1887–1892)
- 25 pfennig (nickel, 1909–1912)

=== Silver coins ===
Subsidiary silver coins were minted in .900 fineness to a standard of 5 grams silver per mark. Production of 2- and 5-mark coins ceased in 1915, while 1-mark coins continued to be issued until 1916. A few 3-mark coins were minted until 1918, and 1/2-mark coins continued to be issued in silver until 1919.

- 20 pfennig, 1.1111 g (1 g silver), only until 1878
- 1/2 mark or 50 pfennig, 2.7778 g (2.5 g silver)
- 1 mark, 5.5555 g (5 g silver)
- 2 mark, 11.1111 g (10 g silver)
- 3 mark, 16.6667 g (15 g silver), from 1908 onwards
- 5 mark, 27.7778 g (25 g silver)

These silver coins are token or subsidiary currency for the gold mark and are therefore legal tender only up to 20 marks. However, all silver 3-mark Vereinsthalers issued before 1871 enjoyed unlimited legal tender status even after the switch-over to the gold standard. For German one-thaler pieces, this status ended on 1 October 1907. A law of 19 May 1908 authorized new subsidiary 3-mark coins.

The 5-mark coin, however, was significantly closer in value to older thalers (and other such crown-sized coins).

=== Gold coins ===
1877 German 20 Mark gold coin, Wilhelm I era

Gold coins were minted in .900 fineness to a standard of 2,790 marks = 1 kilogram of gold (a mark was therefore about 5.5313 grains or 0.35842 grams of gold; a troy ounce of gold was worth 86.78 ℳ︁). Gold coin production ceased in 1915. 5-mark gold coins were minted only in 1877 and 1878.

- 5 mark, 1.9912 g (1.7921 g gold)
- 10 mark, 3.9825 g (3.5842 g gold)
- 20 mark, 7.965 g (7.1685 g gold)

For 10- and 20-mark gold pieces, the statutory Passiergewicht sat five parts per thousand below the standard weight, about 3.9626 and 7.9251 grams. Public cash offices could not reissue coins below that threshold. Coins worn down through ordinary circulation were withdrawn at the Reich's expense, but coins reduced by force or fraud carried no such guarantee. Weighing gold coins was therefore a routine part of handling cash.

The new imperial gold coinage had barely entered circulation before 20-mark pieces turned up that had clearly been shaved down on purpose. Investigators linked a number of them to payments made through the Port of Hamburg and concluded that the coins had been tampered with after leaving the mint and were not struck underweight in the first place.

The 20-mark coin is the most commonly seen. Mass-produced examples come in a variety of different types and can therefore be purchased at a low premium above their melt value. However, some designs are extremely elusive given that they were struck in very low mintages. The rarest type features Adolph Friedrich V; just 1,160 pieces were issued by the Berlin Mint.

== Banknotes ==
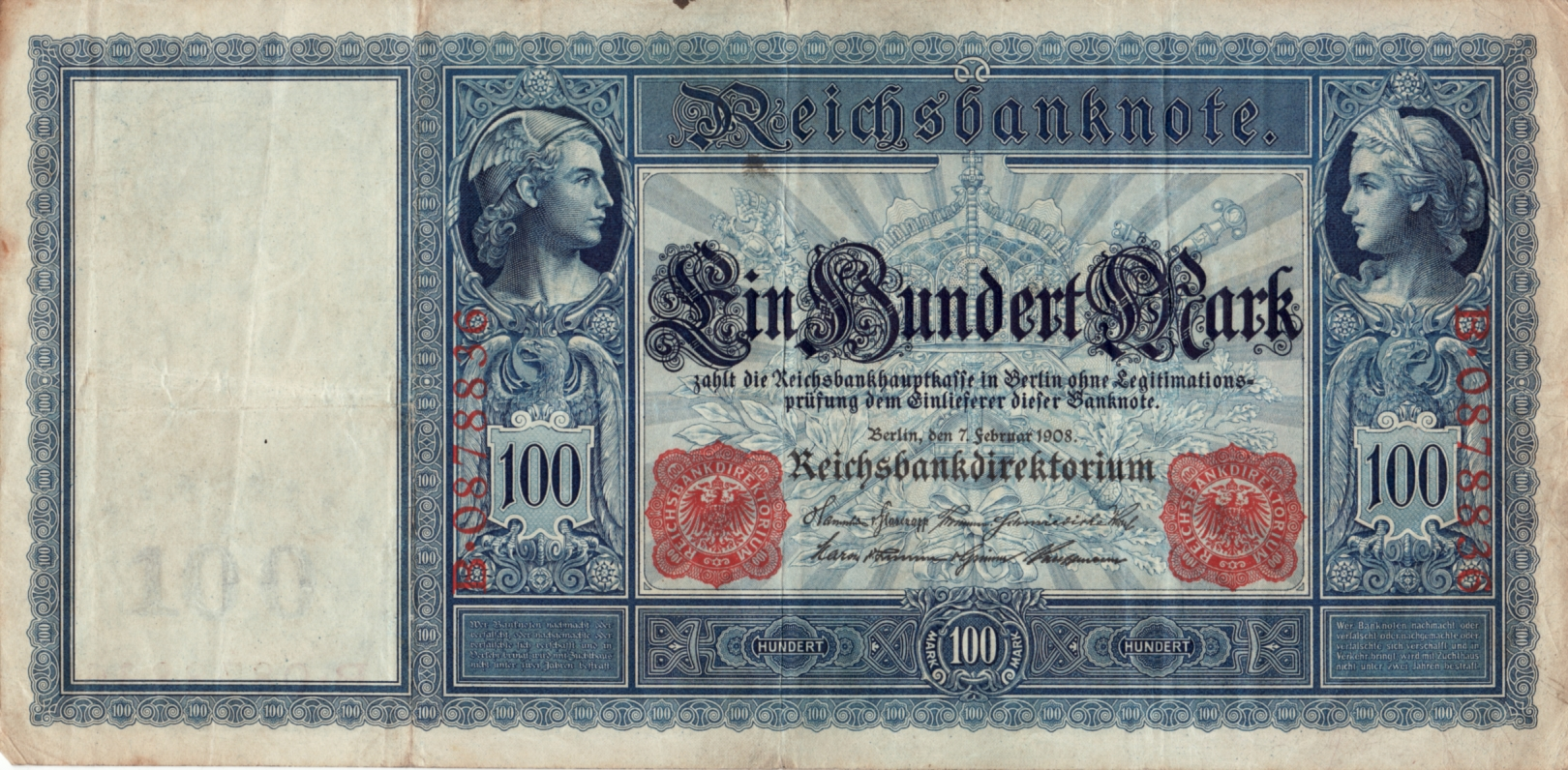
100-mark banknote from 1908

Banknotes were issued by the Imperial Treasury as "Reichskassenscheine" and by the Reichsbank, as well as by the banks of some of the states. Imperial Treasury notes were issued in denominations of 5, 10, 20 and 50 Mark, whilst Reichsbank notes were produced in denominations of 20, 50, 100 and 1000 Mark. The notes issued after 1914 are referred to as Papiermark notes.

== Currency signs ==
In Unicode, the Mark sign is U+2133 ℳ SCRIPT CAPITAL M. The Pfennig sign is U+20B0 ₰ GERMAN PENNY SIGN.

== Notes ==
Preceded by: Vereinsthaler; Location: many German states Reason: German unification Ratio: 1 Mark = 1/3 Vereinsthaler	Currency of Germany; 1871 – 1914	Succeeded by: Papiermark; Reason: suspension of gold standard Ratio: at par
Preceded by: South German Gulden; Location: southern Germany incl. Bavaria, Baden, Württemberg, Frankfurt and Hohenzollern; Reason: German unification Ratio: 1 Mark = 7/12 Gulden	Currency of Germany; 1871 – 1914	Succeeded by: Papiermark; Reason: suspension of gold standard Ratio: at par
Preceded by: Bremen Thaler; Location: Bremen; Reason: German unification Ratio: 1 Mark = 28/93 Thaler, or 3 9/28 Mark = 1 Thaler	Currency of Germany; 1871 – 1914	Succeeded by: Papiermark; Reason: suspension of gold standard Ratio: at par
Preceded by: Hamburg Mark; Location: Hamburg; Reason: German unification Ratio: 1 new Mark = 5/6 Hamburg Mark	Currency of Germany; 1871 – 1914	Succeeded by: Papiermark; Reason: suspension of gold standard Ratio: at par
Preceded by: French franc Location: Alsace-Lorraine; Reason: German unification Ratio: 0.81 Mark = 1 French Franc	Currency of Germany; 1871 – 1914	Succeeded by: Papiermark; Reason: suspension of gold standard Ratio: at par
