= South German gulden =

Southern German currency from 1754 to 1873

The South German gulden (German: Süddeutsche Gulden) was the currency of the states of Southern Germany between 1754 and 1873. These states included Bavaria, Baden, Württemberg, Frankfurt and Hohenzollern. It was divided into 60 kreuzer, with each kreuzer worth 4 pfennig or 8 heller.

== History ==
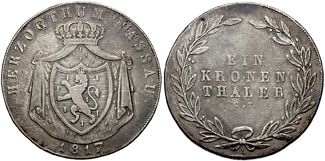
Kronenthaler of Nassau, 1817, accepted for 2.7 South German gulden.

This specific Gulden was based on the Gulden or florin used in the Holy Roman Empire during the Late Middle Ages and Early Modern period. The Gulden first emerged as a common currency of the Holy Roman Empire after the 1524 Reichsmünzordnung in the form of the Guldengroschen. In the succeeding centuries the Gulden was then defined as a fraction of the Reichsthaler specie or silver coin.

As of 1690 the Gulden used in Southern Germany and the Austrian Empire adhered to the Leipzig standard, with the Gulden worth 1/18 a Cologne Mark of fine silver or 1/2 the Reichsthaler specie coin, or 12.992 g per Gulden. Below is a history (in terms of grams of silver) of the standards of the South German Gulden from 1690 until the gold standard was introduced in 1873. A comparison with the higher-valued Austro-Hungarian gulden is also included. The course of value of the Gulden before 1618 is found under Reichsthaler.

Values of South German gulden & Austrian florin, in grams silver
Standard	South German Gulden	Austrian florin
1690: Reichsthaler = 2G	12.992	12.992
1741: gold Carolin = 11G	0.68 g gold	0.83 g gold
1753: Conventionsthaler = 2.4G	9.744	11.693
1820s: Kronenthaler = 2.7G	9.524	11.693
1837: Prussian thaler = 1.75G	9.545	11.693
1857: Vereinsthaler = 1.75G	9.524	11.111

The Gulden departed from this standard in the 1730s when the gold-silver price ratio dropped from 15 to 14.5, prompting many states to reissue their Gulden in cheaper gold. The South German Gulden then departed from the Austro-Hungarian gulden after it valued the Carolin d'or of 7.51 g fine gold at 11 Gulden in Southern Germany versus 9 Gulden in Austria. Each South German gulden was therefore worth 7.51 ÷ 11 = 0.6827 g fine gold or 0.6827 × 14.5 = 9.9 g fine silver.

The South German states therefore could not comply with the Austrian currency convention of 1754 which set the Austro-Hungarian gulden at 1/2 Conventionsthaler, or 11.6928 g fine silver. They instead adopted a lower-valued South German Gulden worth 1/24 Cologne Mark of fine silver, or 5/12 Conventionsthaler, or 9.744 g silver per gulden. Currency was issued only up to 3 and 6 kreutzer Landmünze (or local coins, of 1/20 and 1/10 Gulden), with larger Austrian coins accepted at a 20% higher value in Southern Germany.

This Conventionsthaler, containing 23.3856 g fine silver and valued at 2.4 Gulden (or 9.744 g per Gulden), was superseded between 1807 and 1837 by the minting of Kronenthaler coins containing 25.71 g fine silver but valued at 2.7 gulden (or only 9.524 g per Gulden), in a competitive currency depreciation between the various South German states. The French écu of 26.67 g fine silver was also accepted at 2.8 gulden.

The situation above was only resolved by the Munich Coinage Treaty of 1837 which redefined the Gulden at 2/49 Cologne mark or 9.545 g of silver. This allowed for an exchange rate of 1 3/4 Gulden to 1 Prussian Thaler. In addition to the 3 and 6 kreutzer and smaller pieces, new coins were introduced in denominations of 1/2, 1 and 2 Gulden, as well as the Vereinsmünze (Union Coin) worth 3 1/2 South German gulden or 2 Prussian thalers.

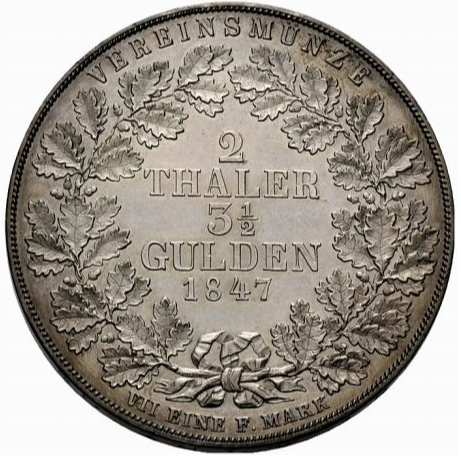
Vereinsmünze (Union Coin), 1847, of Waldeck and Pyrmont, for 2 Prussian thalers = 3.5 South German Gulden

In 1857 the Vienna Monetary Treaty introduced a second Vereinsmünze in the form of the Vereinsthaler, with fractionally less silver than the Prussian Thaler, but still valued at 1 3/4 Gulden. While the 3 1/2 South German gulden coin was redenominated as 2 Vereinsthaler, no changes were made to the other denominations.

Following the Unification of Germany in 1871, the newly formed German Empire adopted the Goldmark in 1873 as it began to standardise to a single currency within its borders, and chose to decimalise. One Mark, (written as 1ℳ ), was subdivided into one-hundred Pfennig (written as 100₰ ), with the mark having an exchange equal to 35 kreutzer, or 7/12 gulden, as the South German Gulden began to be withdrawn over the next three years.

From 1 January 1876 the Gulden and the Kreuzer, along with all other forms of currency which existed previously in what was now the German Empire, were abolished.

(The decimal Goldmark became the only legal tender, until 4 August 1914 when the link between the Mark and gold was abandoned with the outbreak of World War I, and replaced by the Papiermark).

== Sources ==
- Krause, Chester L.; Clifford Mishler (1991). Standard Catalog of World Coins: 1801–1991 (18th ed.). Krause Publications. ISBN 0873411501.
- Pick, Albert (1990). Bruce, Colin R. II; Shafer, Neil (eds.). Standard Catalog of World Paper Money: Specialized Issues (6th ed.). Krause Publications. ISBN 0-87341-149-8.
- Shaw, William Arthur (1896), "The Monetary System of Germany" in The History of Currency, 1252–1894 by Shaw. London: Clement Wilson; NY: G.P. Putnam's Sons. pp. 360–393.

Preceded by Conventionsthaler	South German currency 1754–1873	Succeeded by German Goldmark
