= Stolberg thaler =

German currency used from the 15th to 18th century

The North German thaler was the currency issued by the County of Stolberg, and after multiple divisions, by its successors Stolberg-Stolberg, Stolberg-Rossla, Stolberg-Wernigerode, Stolberg-Königstein, and Stolberg-Rochefort counties. It was issued from the late 15th century until mid 18th century when Stolberg-Wernigerode was forced to subordinate themselves to the Kingdom of Prussia and the counts of Stolberg-Stolberg and Stolberg-Rossla to the Electorate of Saxony. Numerous coinage issued by Stolberg counties was made possible by rich silver mines in their possessions.

The Stolberg thaler was distinctive in its design, featuring the coat of arms of Stolberg on one side and stag facing left, often in front of a column, on the other. The coin was minted from high-quality silver and was considered to be of good weight and fineness.

== Mintmasters ==
- AL – Andreas Lafferts (1612-1617)
- CZ – Christoph Ziegenhorn (1618-1626, 1632)
- IK – Johann Krieg (1645-1660)
- IIG – Johann Jeremias Grundler (1705-1750)
- C, IEVC – Johann Eberhard Volkmar Claus (1750-1765)
- EFR – Ernst Friedrich Rupstein (1766-1792)
- EHAZ, Z – Ernst Hermann Agathus Ziegler (1792-1807)

== Literature ==
- Germanic coinages Charlemagne through Wilhelm II. William D. Craig 1954
- German Talers 1700-1800. John S. Davenport 1979
