= Pistole =

Spanish gold coin

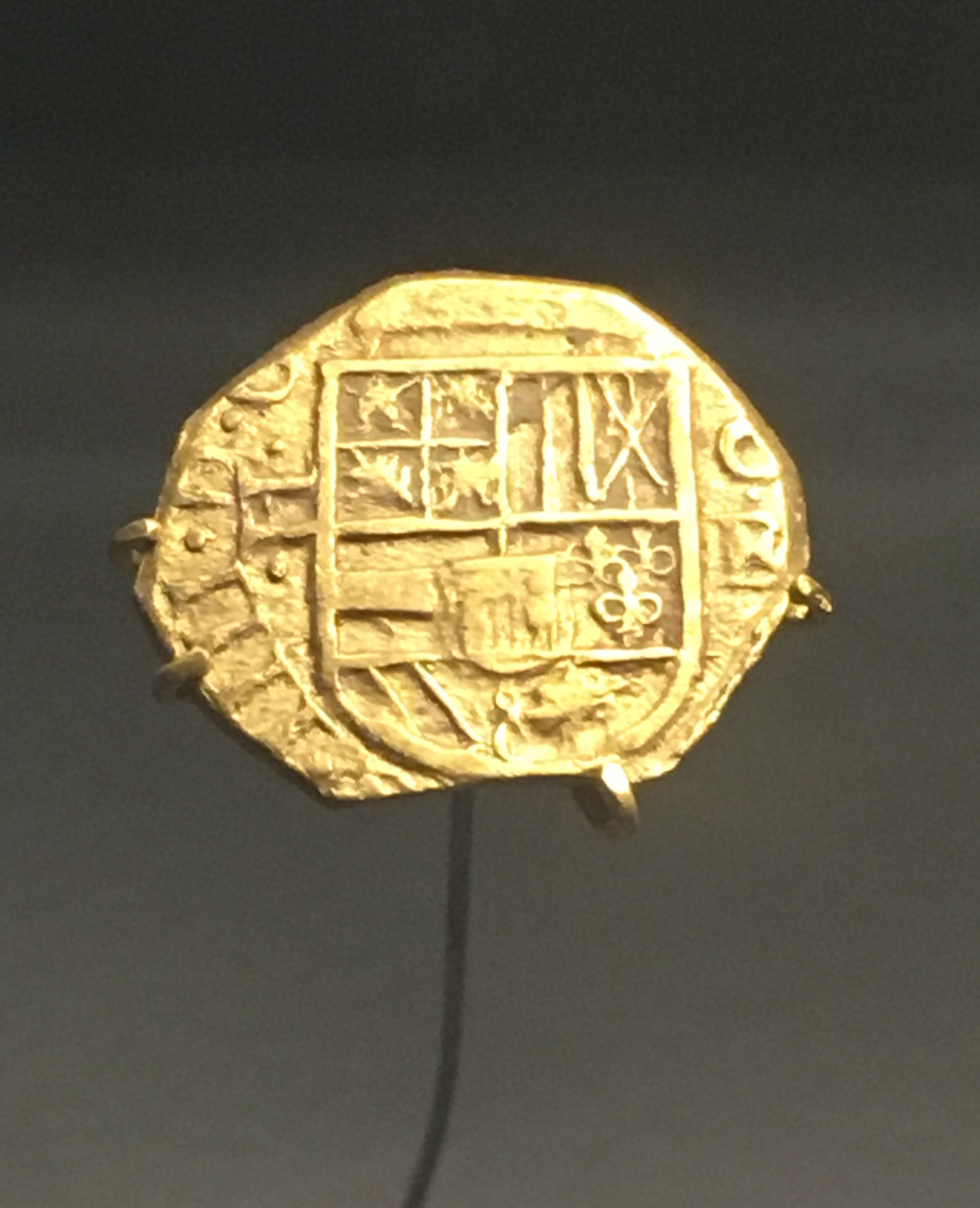
Double escudo ("pistole") of Felipe IV, 1630

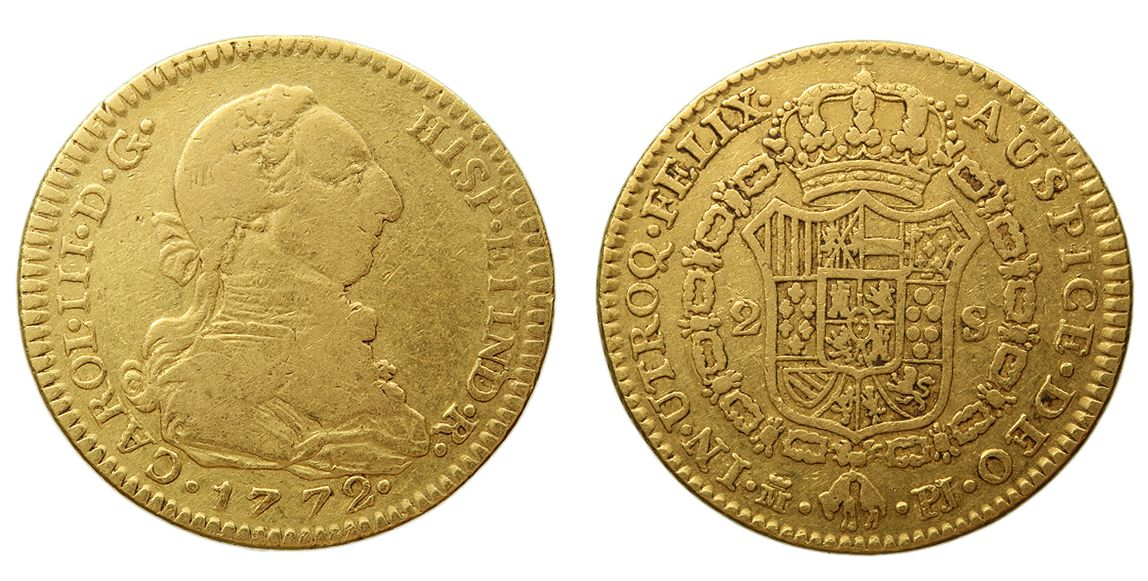
Double escudo ("pistole") of Carlos III, 1772

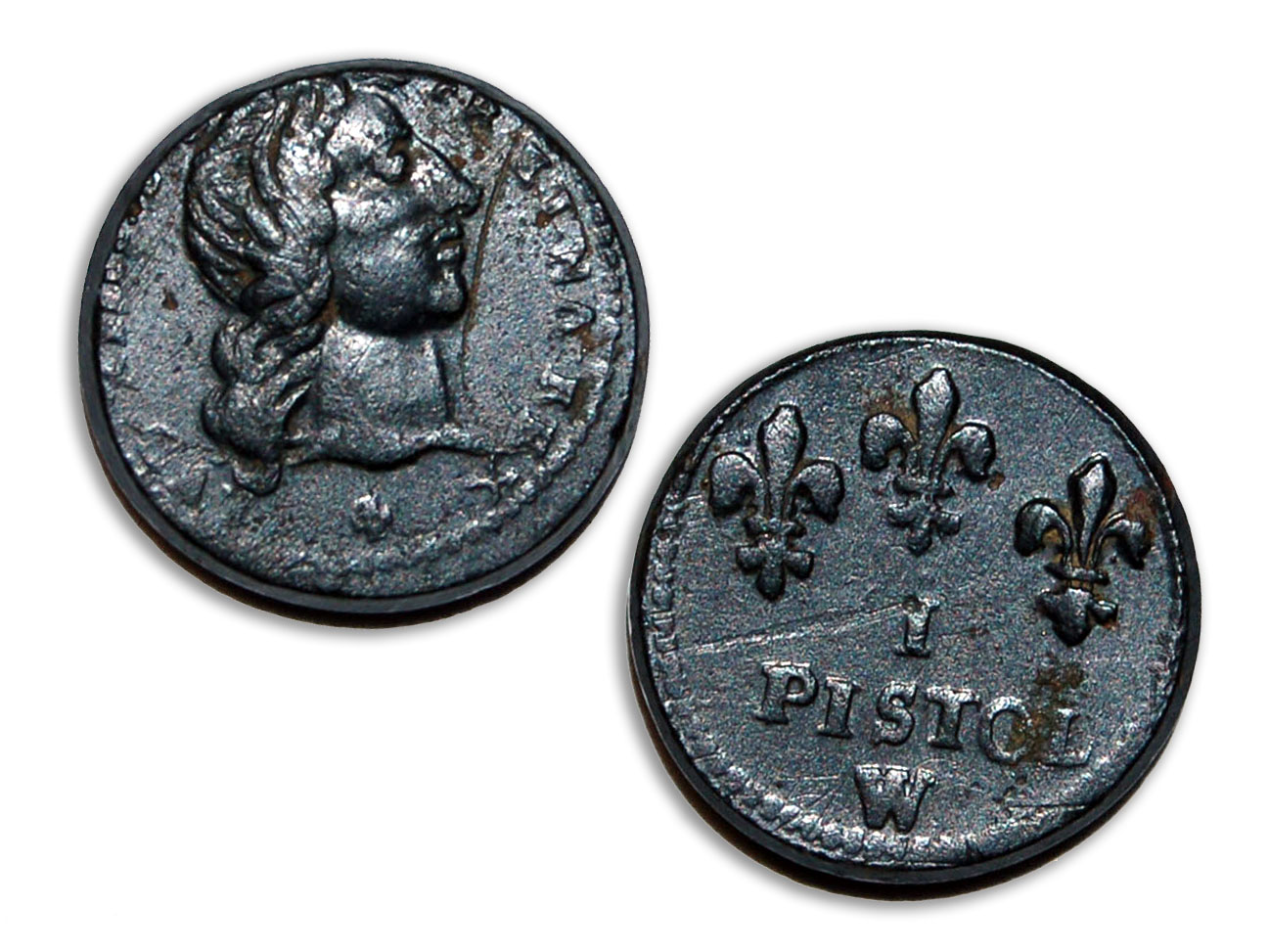
Pistole coin weight, c. 1690

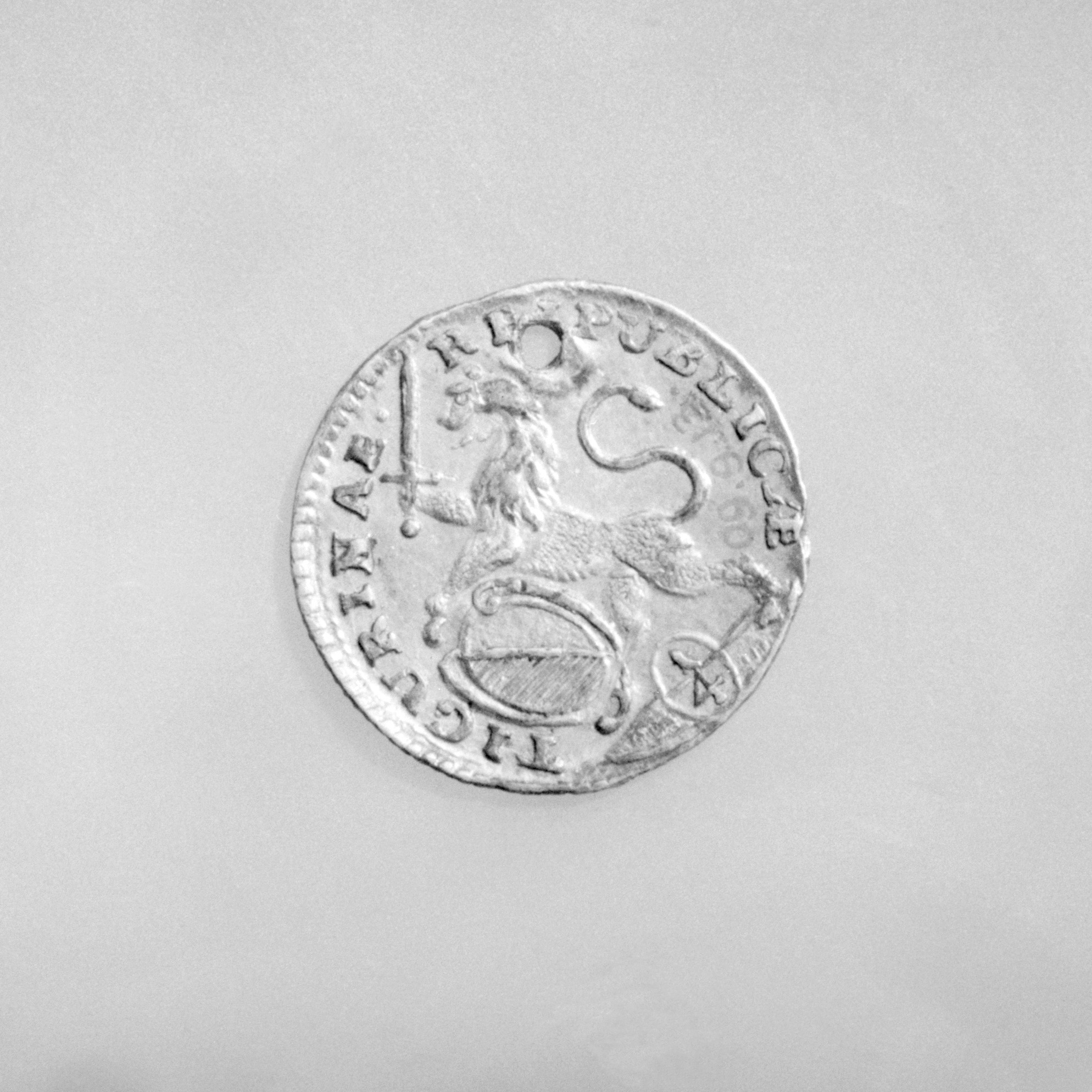
Quarter-ducat of the Canton of Zürich, 1751; nicknamed "pistole"

Pistole is the French name given to a Spanish gold coin in use from 1537; it was a doubloon or double escudo, the gold unit. The name was also given to the Louis d'Or of Louis XIII of France, and to other European gold coins of about the value of the Spanish coin. One pistole was worth approximately ten livres or three écus, but higher figures are also seen. The derivation is uncertain; the term may come from the Czech píšťala ("whistle", a term for a hand cannon), or from the Italian town of Pistoia; either way, it was originally spelled pistolet and originated in military slang, and probably has the same root as pistol.

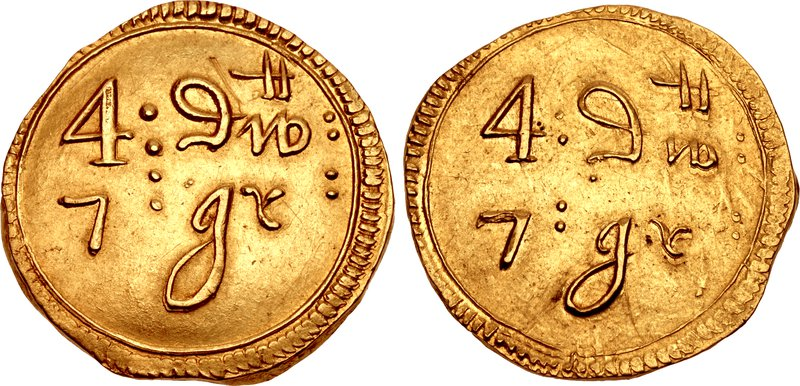
Irish gold pistole, bearing its weight (4 dwt 7 gr) (National Museum of Ireland – Decorative Arts and History)

A small number of gold pistoles and double pistoles were minted in Ireland in 1646, during the Irish Confederate Wars and the reign of Charles I. James Butler, 1st Duke of Ormond authorised the issue in order to prevent troop defections, as there was a shortage of silver coins for paying soldiers. The coins had an approximate value of 13 shillings (26 s. for the double pistole); they are today worth over £65,000, as only eleven examples are known to survive. They are the only gold coins ever struck in Ireland, except for a small number of proof and ECU issues. The pistole weighed 103 grains (6.67 grams; 0.215 troy oz) while the double pistole was 206 grains (13.35 grams; 0.429 troy oz); the fineness was 19 karat. The coins (also called "pieces" or "pledges") did not bear any royal symbols, simply their weight (4 dwt 7 gr, or 8 dwt 14 gr) on both sides.

A coin with this name was minted in Scotland in 1701, under William III, with a weight of 106 grains (c. 6.84 g) and a value of 12 pounds Scots.

The coin appears repeatedly in Dumas' fiction. He has his character state, in The Three Musketeers set in the 1620s, that one hundred pistoles were worth a thousand livres tournois when Athos bargains for the horse he takes to the battle of La Rochelle.

It was also referred to by Raphael Sabatini; who wrote 'swashbuckling' tales of the 17th and 18th centuries; in his book, St Martin's Summer.

The coin gave its name to the town of Trois-Pistoles, Quebec, where according to local legend an explorer lost a goblet worth three pistoles in the river.

== In Germany ==
Frederick the Great issued the Friedrich d'or pistole of 5 thalers in 1741 while the gold-silver price ratio of 14.5 was low, making it cheaper to reissue the thaler currency in gold. At 6.05 g fine gold per pistole, each thaler was worth 1.21g fine gold & 1.21 x14.5 = 17.545 g fine silver, cheaper than the prevailing standard of 19.488 g fine silver per thaler. The different North German states followed minting the 5-thaler pistole under their rulers' names (August-, Friedrich-August- or Christian d'or).

Its standard varied slightly; at best 35 to a Cologne Mark of gold 130/144 fine, or 6.032 g fine gold; and at worst 35 1/6 to a Mark 129/144 fine, or 5.957 g fine gold. The North German pistole was minted from 1741 to 1855.
