= Prussian thaler =

Currency of Prussia from 1750 to 1857

The Prussian Thaler (sometimes Prussian Reichsthaler) was the currency of Prussia until 1857. In 1750, Johann Philipp Graumann implemented the Graumannscher Fuß with 14 thalers issued to a Cologne Mark of fine silver, or 16.704 g per thaler.

Gold coins were called as Friedrich d'or from 1750 to 1857 except for 1797 (Ducant in 1797), and silver coins were called as Thalers. The weight, and finesse of coins had changed as the kings changed.

Until 1821, the thaler was subdivided in Brandenburg into 24 Groschen, each of 12 Pfennige. In Prussia proper, it was subdivided into 3 Polish Gulden = FL = Zloty , each of 30 Groschen (each Groschen = 18 Pfennige) or 90 Schilling. Prussia's currency was unified in 1821, with the Thaler subdivided into 30 Silbergroschen, each of 12 Pfennige.

While the predominant North German thaler used in other North German states from 1750 to 1840 was issued 13 1/3 to a Mark and appeared in denominations of 2/3 and 1 1/3 thalers, the Prussian thaler was issued 14 to a Mark and appeared as a 1-thaler coin.

From the 1840s, several states set the value of the North German thaler to parity with the Prussian thaler, also 14 to a Mark. In 1857, these North German and Prussian thalers were replaced by the Vereinsthaler, having become the standard across much of Germany.
