= Cologne mark =

Unit of weight

The Cologne mark (German: Kölner Mark) is an obsolete unit of weight (or mass) equivalent to 233.856 grams (about 3,609 grains). The Cologne mark was in use from the 11th century onward. It came to be used as the base unit for a number of currency standards, including the Lübeck monetary system, which was important in northern Europe in the late Middle Ages, and the coinage systems of the Holy Roman Empire, most significantly the 1754 conventionsthaler, defined as 1/10 of a Cologne mark. The conventionsthaler replaced the reichsthaler, 1/9 of a Cologne mark.

The mark is defined as half a Cologne Pfund (pound). A Pfund is divided into 16 Unzen (ounces) of 29.23 grams (about 451 grains). Each Unze is subdivided into 2 Lote, 8 Quentchen, and 32 Pfennige. This ounce is the basis of several other pounds, including in England the Tower pound (12 ounces), the merchant's pound (15 ounces), and the London pound (16 ounces).

The Cologne Pfund (2 marks) should not be confused with the Pfund of around 350 grams, 5400 grains, used in the Nuremberg apothecaries' system (Apothekergewicht), and is approximately equal to the old Tower pound (1 1/2 marks). This Pfund has 12 Unzen, each of which contains 36 Gran, with the Gran equal to 0.812 grams (about 12.53 grains).

Throughout Europe, different variants of the Cologne mark have been used. In Castile, a Cologne mark of 230 grams was used since medieval times. In the late Middle Ages, Portugal used local variants of the marks of Cologne (Colonha) and Troyes (Tria), the first for coinage and precious metals and the second for haver-de-peso (avoirdupois). In mid-15th century, these marks were rounded to establish a relation of 14:13 between the Portuguese variants of Cologne and Troyes, leading to metric equivalences of 228.9 grams and 246.5 grams, respectively. In modern times, the Portuguese mark of Cologne drifted towards 229.5 grams.

== See also ==
- Reichsmünzordnung
