= Hamburg mark =

Hamburger currencies used until 1875

Hamburger Mark (German)
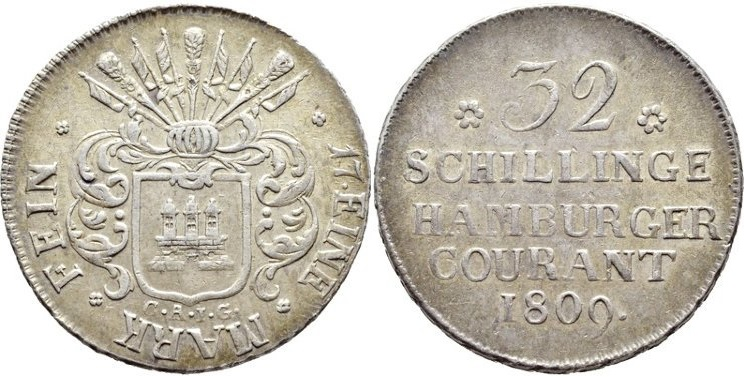
- 32 Schilling coin 1809

Unit
- Plural: Mark

Denominations
- Subunit
- 1/16: Schilling
- 1/192: Pfennig
- Plural
- Schilling: Schillinge
- Pfennig: Pfennige

Demographics
- User(s): Hamburg, British Heligoland

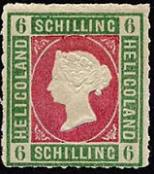
British Heligoland postage stamp showing Queen Victoria and denominated in Hamburg schillings.

The Hamburg Mark refers to two distinct currencies issued in the city of Hamburg until 1875:

- The Hamburg Mark Banco, a bank money and an accounting unit, and
- The Hamburg Mark Courant, an actual coin.

Each mark was divided into 16 schilling, each of 12 pfennig. Three marks were equal to a Reichsthaler, Germany's main unit of currency which the Hamburger Bank (Bank of Hamburg) defined and maintained until 1875.

== Hamburg Mark Banco ==
The Hamburg Mark Banco was a form of bank money created by the Hamburger Bank in 1619 in order to provide a more reliable medium of exchange in the midst of the monetary chaos of the Kipper und Wipperzeit. It accepted silver of verified weight from customers and credited their accounts in a Reichsthaler-equivalent unit called the Hamburg Reichsthaler Banco, which was equal to 3 Hamburg Marks Banco and was further subdivided as follows:

- 1 Reichsthaler Banco = 3 Marks Banco, each of 16 schillings, and also as
- 1 Reichsthaler Banco = 0.4 Pound Flemish, each of 20 schillings Flemish or 240 grotes Flemish.

This Mark Banco turned out to be one of Europe's most stable currencies. While the Reichsthaler was originally defined as 25.984 grams (1/9th a Cologne mark, or 233.856 g) fine silver, the Bank of Amsterdam's lower standard for the Dutch rijksdaalder of 25.4 g prevailed for the next two centuries. From 1770 the Hamburger Bank accepted bullion and coin, buying one Cologne mark of fine silver for 27 5/8 marks banco (9 5/24 thalers, or 25.40 g per thaler), and selling it for 27 3/4 marks (9 1/4 thalers, or 25.28 g per thaler). The reichsthaler banco of Hamburg and Amsterdam was also equivalent to the Danish rigsdaler specie and the Norwegian rigsdaler specie.

The Vienna Monetary Treaty of 1857 unified the various German currencies with the Vereinsthaler of 16 2/3 g fine silver, with Hamburg's Reichsthaler Banco worth 1.5169 Vereinsthaler. With full German unification in 1871 and the introduction of a uniform German gold mark currency in 1873 there was little need for an institution like the Hamburger Bank to verify the value of the currency of a unified Germany. The bank was closed in 1875 with the Reichsthaler Banco or 3 Marks Banco converted to 4.5 gold marks.

== Hamburg Mark Courant or Currency ==
Even with the existence of standardized currency denominated in Reichsthalers and Marks Banco, it was desired to issue coins (or courant) in Northern Germany valued at a fraction of these standard units. Hamburg first issued local currency in 1667 at a tale of 1 Cologne Mark = 10.5 thalers courant = 31.5 marks courant (the Zinnaische standard). In 1690 it then decided to follow the standard used by Lübeck, with a tale of 1 Cologne Mark = 11 1/3 thalers = 34 marks courant. This Hamburg Mark Courant was worth 27.625/34 = 13/16th of a Hamburg Mark Banco (or 6.88 g fine silver) and was also divided into 16 schillings courant.

A mostly similar currency system was used in Denmark, Norway and Schleswig-Holstein, but with a slightly lower thaler courant worth 4/5 of the Reichsthaler specie, so that the latter equalled 60 schillings courant (or 120 skillings Danske in Denmark and Norway).

Prussian thalers and Vereinsthalers became more common in Hamburg after 1840 and began to be exchanged for a higher price of 2 1/2 marks courant, thus implying a lower tale of 35 marks courant or 6.67 g fine silver. Germany's 1871 law on gold coinage let debts stated in Lübeck or Hamburg courant be settled in the new 10- and 20-mark gold pieces, at rates the law itself fixed. The statutory equivalents were 8 marks 5 1/3 schillings courant for a 10-mark piece and 16 marks 10 2/3 schillings courant for a 20-mark piece.

The withdrawal was denomination-specific: Lübeck speciesthalers, three-mark pieces and the 12-, 2-, 1-, 1/2- and 1/4-schilling denominations lost legal tender status on 1 October 1875, while 2- and 1-mark pieces and the 8- and 4-schilling denominations followed on 1 November. The coins could be exchanged at designated public treasuries through 31 December at a rate of 1.20 marks of the new imperial currency for every mark courant. Redemption was carried out for the account of the German Empire, and after 31 December 1875 the appointed treasuries no longer accepted or exchanged the old coins.

== Use in Lübeck ==
Lübeck ceased minting coins after 1801 but continued to use the same currency system as Hamburg until German unification. The Hanseatic city-states of Bremen, Hamburg and Lübeck did not join either the Dresden Coinage Convention of 1838 or the Vienna Monetary Treaty of 1857, retaining their separate monetary systems until the imperial currency was legislated in 1871 and 1873.

Danish coins brought in by Baltic trade also circulated in the city. By 1856, Lübeck's banking landscape included two private banks of issue: the Lübecker Privatbank and the Credit- und Versicherungsbank, renamed the Commerz-Bank in Lübeck in 1859.

By the time of the introduction of the German mark in 1873, Hamburg currency constituted 61% of the coins in circulation in Lübeck.

== See also ==
- Reichsthaler
- Prussian thaler
- Hamburger Bank
- de:Mark Banco
