= Vienna Monetary Treaty =

1857 currency treaty

The Vienna Monetary Treaty (also known as the Vienna Coinage Treaty) of 1857 was a treaty that set a currency standard for use across the German Zollverein states, Austria, and Liechtenstein. The official name of the treaty was Monetary Treaty Between the German States of 24 January 1857.

== History ==
At the time there were three competing monetary systems in Germany, in Austria, Prussia and south Germany. The Mint Conference and Convention in Vienna sought to eliminate the problems from this, and the treaty was the result.

The treaty remained in force until the unification of Germany in 1871.

== Main terms ==
Article 1: The pound, with a weight of 500 g, would serve as the basis of the coinage system.

Articles 2 and 3: There would be a single silver standard, but three national coinage systems would be permitted:

- The Prussian standard of 30 thalers per pound of silver, to replace the prior 14-thaler per Cologne Mark standard, for use in Prussia, Saxony, Hanover, Hesse, Grand Duchy of Saxe-Weimar-Eisenach and the Duchies of Saxe-Altenburg, Saxe-Gotha, Brunswick, Oldenburg (including Birkenfeld), Anhalt-Dessau, and Anhalt-Bernburg; in the Principality of Schwarzburg-Sondershausen and the Subordinate Lordship of the Principality of Schwarzburg-Rudolstadt; in the Principalities of Waldeck and Pyrmont, Reuss of the senior line and Reuss of the junior line, Schaumburg-Lippe, and Lippe. (The states had a total population of 23 million.)
- The Austrian standard of 45 guldens per pound of silver, for use in the Austrian Empire and the principality of Liechtenstein. (The states had a total population of 35 million.)
- The South German standard of 52.5 guldens per pound of silver, for use in Bavaria, Württemberg, Grand Duchies of Baden and Hesse; in the Duchy of Saxe-Meiningen, Principality of Saxe-Coburg, the Hohenzollern domains in Prussia, Duchy of Nassau, Overlordship of the Principality of Schwarzburg-Rudolstadt, the Landgraviate of Hesse-Homburg, and the Free City of Frankfurt. (The states had a total population of between 9 and 10 million.)

Article 4: The exchange rates of the system would bw 1 thaler convention piece (1/30 point) = 1.5 florins (Austrian currency) = 1.75 florin (South Germany currency). All coins made in accordance to the treaty were to be legal tender in all states.

Article 5: Mintage by all states would be limited to silver coins as specified in this treaty, but Austria was allowed continue to coin the "Levantine thaler" dated 1780 (better known today as the Maria Theresa thaler). The smallest fractional coins authorized under the three national coinage systems were

- The one-sixth thaler piece in Prussian currency.
- The one-fourth florin piece in Austrian currency.
- The one-fourth florin piece in South German currency.

States had to limit their coinage of fractional coin to their necessary requirements.

Article 6: All coins shall be uniformly struck and of full fineness and weight.

Article 7: The fineness shall be expressed in thousandths. In determining the fineness of silver coins, the assay would be performed by the liquid process.

Article 8: For the accommodation and facilitation of international trade among the contracting states, two coins, answering to the specifications of the principal coins, provided for in Article 2 and on the monetary basis there contemplated, would be struck under the denomination of Vereinsthaler.

Article 9: Coins of the old monetary union of 1838 would be full legal tender, and any discrimination against such coins was forbidden.

Article 10: Coins would be 90% silver and 10% copper. A thaler coin would be 33 mm in diameter, and two-thaler would will be 41 mm in diameter. Obverse and reverse devices were also specified.

Article 11: Each state would coin at least 24 thaler coins per 100 people by 1862 and at least 16 pieces per 100 people in every four years from 1863. The number of two-thaler coins to be struck was left to the discretion of each individual state.

Article 12: Provides for coinage testing.

Article 13: Provided rules for withdrawal or devaluation.

Articles 14–17: Provided for sub-thaler coins in silver and copper.

Articles 18–20: Provided for golden crowns and half-crowns.

Articles 21–27: Details on rules and duration.

Article 28: The treaty would take effect, after timely ratifications, on 1 May 1857.

== Aftermath ==
The Vienna Monetary Treaty failed to accomplish all of its intended results for two principal reasons. First, it ran counter to the monetary theories, most widely held at the time, which favored a gold standard. Second, unfavourable political events began soon after its adoption. The Second Italian War of Independence broke out between Italy and Austria in 1859, less than two years after the conclusion of the treaty hampered its operation. After the Austro-Prussian War, Austria then withdrew from the monetary union. On 31 July 1867, it adopted to a gold standard by a treaty with the Latin Monetary Union.

== See also ==
- Munich Coinage Treaty
- Dresden Coinage Convention
- Thaler
- Unification of Germany
- Vereinsthaler
