= Zollpfund =

German weight

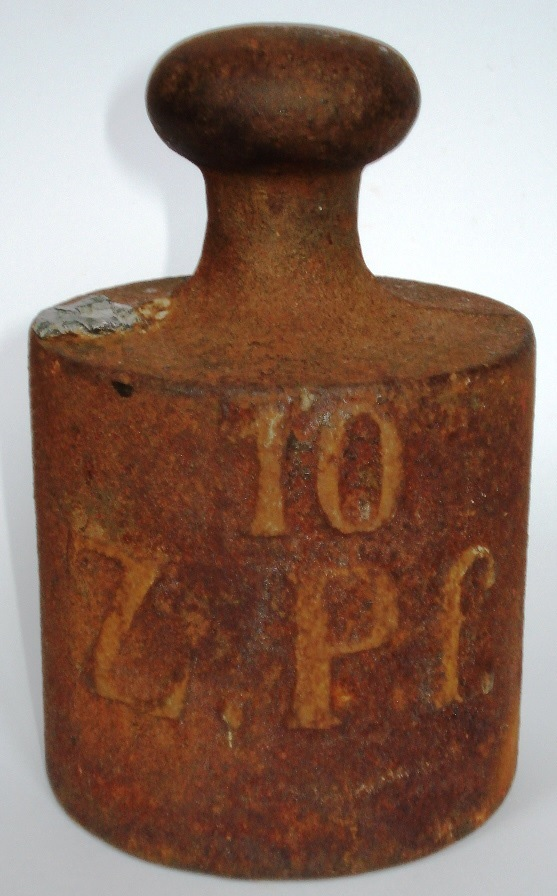
10 Zollpfund weight ("10 Z. Pf.")

The Zollpfund ("customs pound") is an historical German weight based on the old pound. In 1854, the German Customs Union, the Zollverein, fixed the pound weight at exactly 500 grammes, making it about seven percent heavier than the old unit of weight, the Pfund ("pound"). The new pound was called the Zollpfund to distinguish it. The new definition was already in use in the southern German states of Baden, Hesse and in Switzerland, and was introduced in 1858 as a state weight in northern and large parts of central Germany. The Zentner ("hundredweight") corresponded to 50 kilogrammes. As a result, the subordinate units of measurement were also widely redefined:

- In north-eastern and central Germany (including Prussia), 1 Zollpfund = 30 lots = 300 quents (Quentchen) = 3,000 cents = 30,000 grains (Korn).
- In Northwest Germany, 1 Zollpfund = 10 new lots = 100 quents = 1000 half grammes
- In parts of central and southern Germany and in Austria, however, the old pound (Pfund) continued to be divided into 32 lots of 4 quents.

Today's colloquial use of the word Pfund to mean 500 grammes, goes back to the Zollpfund.

== Literature ==
- Bleibtreu, Leopold Carl (1863). Handbuch der Münz-, Maaß- und Gewichtskunde, und des Wechsel-, Staatspapier-, Bank- und Actienwesens europäischer und außereuropäischer Länder und Städte. Stuttgart: J. Engelhorn.
- _ (1866) Allgemeine deutsche Real-Encyklopädie für die gebildeten Stände. Conversations-Lexikon. 11th revised, improved and expanded edn. Vol. 9: Konradin bis Mauer. Leipzig: Brockhaus.
- _ (1867). Allgemeine deutsche Real-Encyklopädie für die gebildeten Stände. Conversations-Lexikon. 11th revised, improved and expanded edn. Vol. 11: Occupation bis Prämie. Leipzig: Brockhaus.
