= Prussian vereinsthaler =

Currency of Prussia

The Vereinsthaler was the currency of Prussia between 1857 and 1873. It replaced the Thaler at par and was replaced by the Mark at a rate of 1 Vereinsthaler = 3 Mark. The Vereinsthaler was subdivided into 30 Silbergroschen, each of 12 Pfennings.

== Literature ==
- William Arthur Shaw (1896). The History of Currency, 1252 to 1896. New York: G.P. Putnam's Sons; London: Clement Wilson.
