= Munich Coinage Treaty =

1837 treaty between southern German states

Members of the South German Münzverein

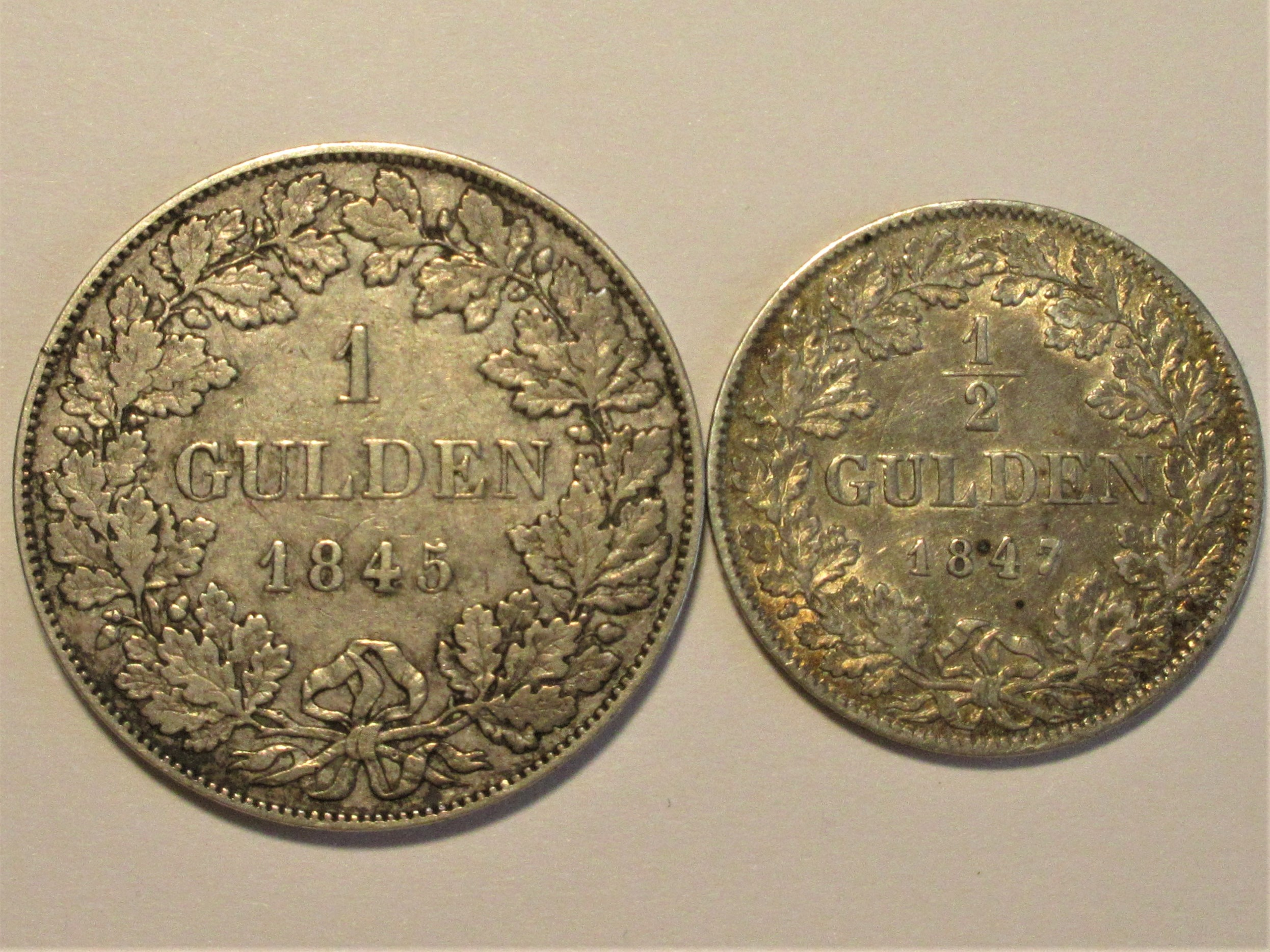
Gulden and 1/2 Gulden based on the stipulations of the Munich Coin Treaty

The Munich Coinage Treaty (German: Münchner Münzvertrag) of 1837 was a treaty between six southern German states who agreed to form the South German Coinage Union (Süddeutsche Münzverein) and to unify their currencies together with some of the central German states. The Munich Coinage Treaty was updated by the South German Coinage Convention of 1845. The agreement is less commonly known as the Munich Coin Treaty.

== Background ==
As early as the 17th and 18th centuries, various German states had tried to harmonise the most important parameters of their coinage. The reason for the passing of the Munich Coinage Treaty was the devaluation of the 1/2 and 1/4 Gulden coins minted to the Kronenthaler standard by the Grand Duchy of Baden. The silver coins minted to the 24 gulden standard of the southern German states had lost a great deal of weight due to abrasion in circulation, so that on average they corresponded to a 24½ gulden standard. With the devaluation, it was intended that the real and the nominal value of the coins should be more closely aligned again.

== Parties to the treaty ==
The following states co-founded the South German Coinage Union: Bavaria, Württemberg, Baden, Hesse-Darmstadt, Nassau and the Free City of Frankfurt.

In 1838 and 1839, Saxe-Meiningen, Hohenzollern-Sigmaringen, Hohenzollern-Hechingen, Hesse-Homburg and Schwarzburg-Rudolstadt also acceded to the treaty. The South German Coinage Union lasted until the introduction of the imperial currency in 1871.

== Treaty provisions ==
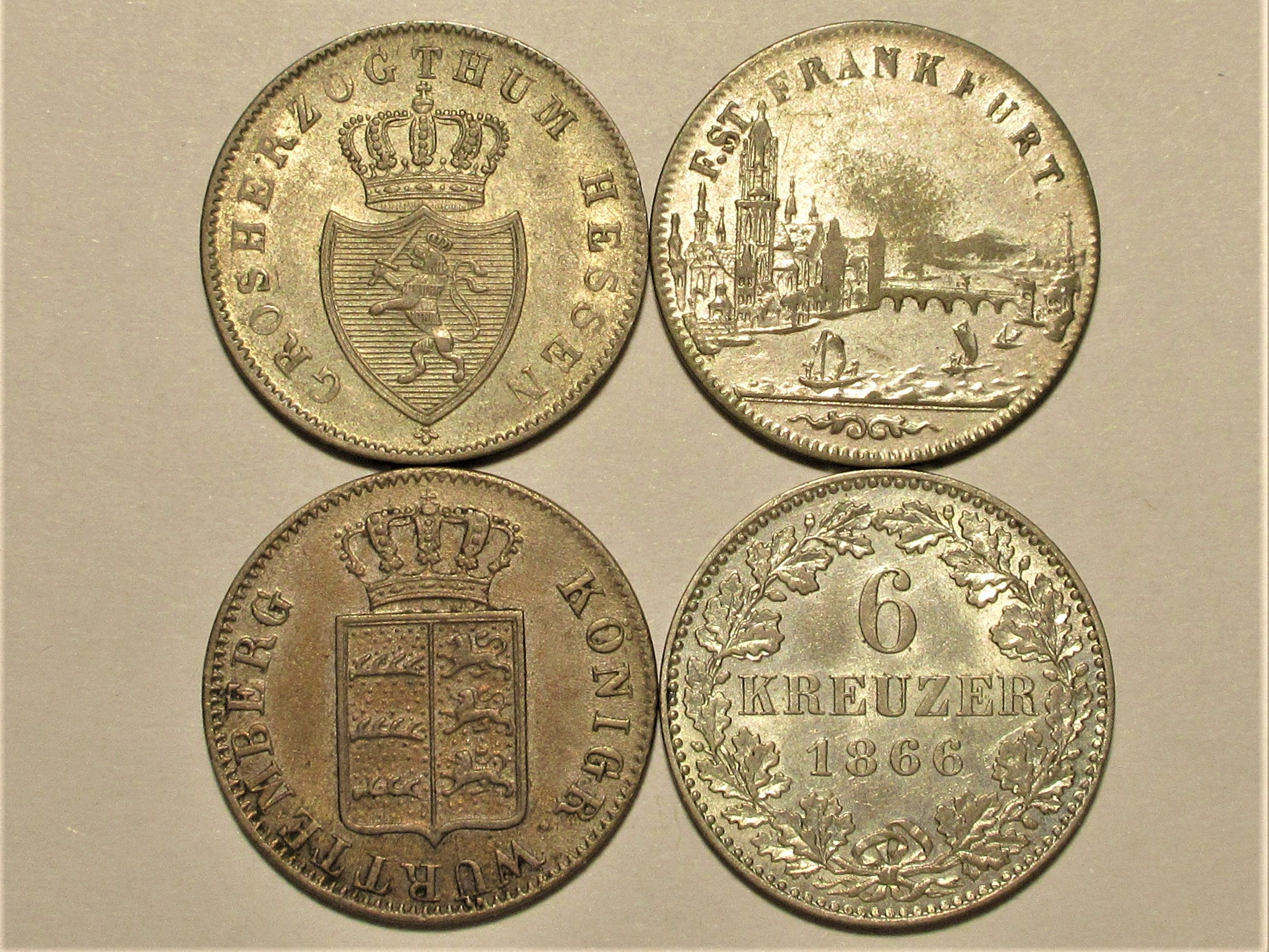
6 Kreuzer pieces from Hesse-Darmstadt, Frankfurt and Württemberg with a standard denomination side

Agreed to on 25 August 1837, the six states agreed that the value of the gulden should be the same, regardless of which of the states issued it, and that the silver content on the gulden should be equal to 90 per cent of the coin's face value. (One reason for these provisions was that they were intended to prevent states from profiting by melting down other states' silver coins and using the silver to mint their own.) The treaty also established that coins minted in any of the six states was legal tender in all six states.

The Cologne Mark was fixed in Article X of the Treaty at a coin base weight of 233.855 grams. From this basic coin weight, 24½ Gulden were minted (Article II), each divided into 60 Kreuzer according to Article III. In a separate agreement alongside the Munich Treaty, standardisation principles for the larger, lower denomination silver coins were agreed.

== Impact ==
With the harmonisation of its own coinage system, the South German Coinage Union not only unified the value of the Gulden within the treaty area, but also created the basis for currency harmonisation with the north German states through the Dresden Coinage Treaty of 1838. There were now 1.75 Gulden in a fixed ratio to 1 Thaler. The larger smaller denomination silver coins were also standardized in terms of design, dimensions and silver content in order to remove obstacles to their mutual acceptance. The relationship between the Gulden and the Kreuzer was now fixed. Previously, the southern German states had basically divided the Gulden into 60 Kreuzers, but occasionally reckoned more than 60 to the Gulden. The conditions below the Kreuzer, on the other hand, remained unregulated. The Heller could correspond to a Pfennig in one state (Frankfurt, Hesse-Darmstadt) or to 1/2 Pfennig in another (Bavaria). Other member states dispensed with the denominations Pfennig and Heller and designated the smallest copper coins as fractions of the Kreuzer (1/4 and even 1/8 Kreuzer in Schwarzburg-Rudolstadt).

The Munich Coin Treaty in part inspired the 1838 Dresden Coinage Convention, by which the Zollverein attempted to standardise its currencies. However, although the Dresden Treaty standardised currency exchange rates, it did not make coins legal tender extraterritorially.

== Literature ==
- Arnold, Paul, Harald Küthmann and Dirk Steinhilber (1970). Großer deutscher Münzkatalog von 1800 bis heute. 32nd edition.
- Clive Parry (ed), Consolidated Treaty Series (Dobbs Ferry, NY: Oceana, 1969) vol. 87, p. 51 (text of treaty in German and English)
- John C. Edmunds and John E. Marthinsen, Wealth by Association: Global Prosperity Through Market Unification (Westport, Conn.: Greenwood, 2003) pp. 98–99.
- Schneider, Konrad (2010) "Hatten die Reichsmünzreformen eine Chance?" In: Harz-Zeitschrift. 62nd annual edn. (online at: books.google.de)
- William Arthur Shaw 1896, The History of Currency, 1252 to 1896 (New York : Augustus M. Kelley, 1967).
- Trapp, Wolfgang (1999). Kleines Handbuch der Münzkunde und des Geldwesens in Deutschland.
