= Vereinsthaler =

Currency of Germany and Austria

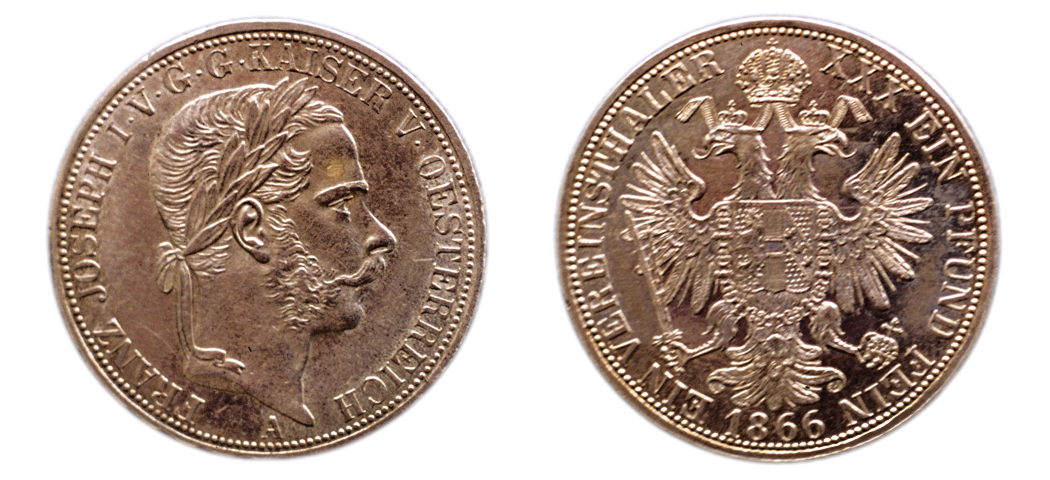
Austrian Vereinsthaler of 1866

The Vereinsthaler (German: [fɛɐ̯ˈʔaɪnsˌtaːlɐ], union thaler) was a standard silver coin of the German Confederation, used in most German states and the Austrian Empire in the years before German unification.

The Vereinsthaler was introduced in 1857 to replace the various versions of the North German thaler, many of which were already set at par with the Prussian thaler. While the earlier Prussian thaler was slightly heavier at 1/14th a Cologne mark of fine silver (16.704 grams), the Vereinsthaler contained 16 2/3 grams of silver, which was indicated on the coins as one-thirtieth of a metric pound (Pfund, equal to 500 grams).

The Hanseatic city-states of Bremen, Hamburg and Lübeck had not joined the Dresden Coinage Convention of 1838 and also stayed out of the Vienna Monetary Treaty of 1857, a choice usually put down to trade ties that reached well beyond Germany's borders; as a result, Hamburg, Bremen and Lübeck never minted Vereinsthalers of their own. Even so, the 1873 Coinage Act required German one- and two-thaler coins to be accepted throughout the empire at three marks per thaler until they were formally withdrawn, which allowed Vereinsthalers to continue circulating in Bremen, Hamburg and Lübeck after unification even though none of the three cities had ever belonged to the monetary union that issued them.

== Distribution ==
Prussia alone struck more than 34 million Vereinsthalers in 1859 and 1860 and about 56 million in 1866 and 1867, helping to establish it as the principal currency coin in Germany.

The Vereinsthaler was used as the base for several different currencies. In Prussia and several other northern German states, the Vereinsthaler was the standard unit of account, divided into 30 Silbergroschen, each of 12 Pfennig. See Prussian Vereinsthaler.

In Saxony, the Neugroschen was equal to the Prussian Silbergroschen but was divided into 10 Pfennig. See Saxon Vereinsthaler. Some other northern German states, such as Hanover, used the name Groschen rather than Silbergroschen for a coin of 12 Pfennig (see Hanoverian Vereinsthaler), while the Mecklenburg states and Hesse-Kassel (or Hesse-Cassel) used entirely distinct subdivisions; see Mecklenburg Vereinsthaler and Hesse-Kassel Vereinsthaler.

In southern Germany, states including Bavaria used the South German gulden as the standard unit of account, with 1 3/4 Gulden = 1 Vereinsthaler. The Gulden was divided into 60 Kreuzer, each of 4 Pfennig or 8 Heller. These states issued Vereinsmünze (union coinage) worth 1 and 2 Vereinsthaler, or 1 3/4 and 3 1/2 gulden. See Bavarian Gulden, Baden Gulden, Württemberg Gulden.

In the Austrian Empire (and later the Austro-Hungarian Empire), a different florin (known as the Gulden in German or forint in Hungarian) was the unit of account, with 1 1/2 florins = 1 Vereinsthaler. The florin was divided into 100 kreuzers.

== Withdrawal ==
Following German unification in 1871, the Goldmark was introduced in 1873 at a rate of 3 marks = 1 Vereinsthaler. Consequently, the new 10 pfennig coins were equivalent to the old Groschen of northern Germany, and "Groschen" became a nickname for the denomination.

Unlike the Goldmark's subsidiary silver coins, which had a legal-tender limit of 20 marks, Vereinsthalers remained legal tender without limit after the move to the gold standard. Their retention at three marks made the Vereinsthaler an important link between the pre-unification silver currencies and the new gold-based imperial mark. This status ended on 1 October 1907, although Reich and state treasuries continued to redeem the coins at three marks until 30 September 1908. A law of May 1908 then authorized a smaller 3-mark coin as subsidiary silver. The name Thaler for the three-mark denomination persisted until the 1930s.

Austria-Hungary stopped issuing Vereinsthaler coins in 1867, following the Austro-Prussian War. Vereinsthalers issued by Austria and Liechtenstein nevertheless remained legal tender in the treaty area even after both states left the monetary union in 1866.

Preceded by North German thaler Prussian thaler	German currency 1857–1873	Succeeded by German Goldmark
