= Dresden Coinage Convention =

1838 treaty of the Zollverein

- Type: Multilateral treaty
- Context: To bring some degree of standardisation to the currencies used in the Zollverein
- Drafted: 30 July 1838
- Signed: 7 January 1839
- Location: Dresden
- Parties: States of the Zollverein

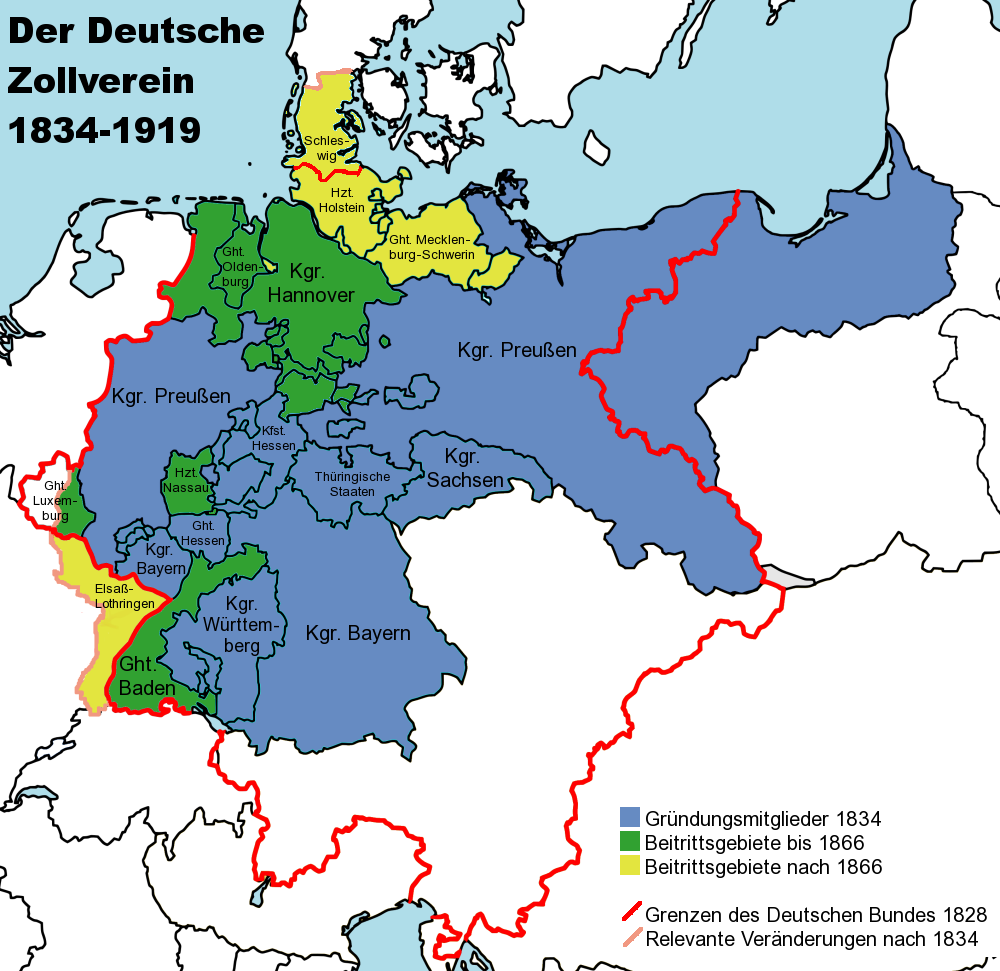
Zollverein, founding states in blue

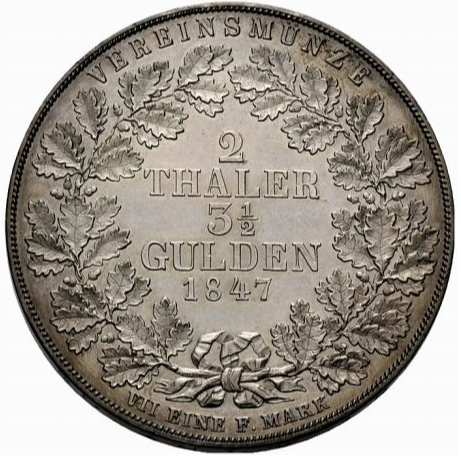
Treaty double Thaler from Waldeck-Pyrmont, known as the "Fat Emma", dated 1847 and bearing the inscription 2 / THALER / 3½ / GULDEN

The Dresden Coinage Convention of 1838 was a multilateral treaty that attempted to bring some degree of standardisation to the currencies used in the Zollverein.

The convention was agreed to at the General Mint Convention of the States of the German Customs Union or Zollverein, held at Dresden. The conference had been prompted in part by the Munich Coinage Treaty of 1837, by which the south German states adopted a unified currency. The Dresden Treaty was concluded on 30 July 1838 and was ratified by the States of the Zollverein at a follow-up meeting on 7 January 1839. The contracting parties to the convention agreed to use either the Prussian thaler or the gulden; the treaty established permanently fixed exchange rates between the two currencies. The thaler was agreed to be equal to 1.75 gulden and thus the gulden was agreed to be equal to 4/7 thaler.

The parties to the treaty were the states that at the time were members of the Zollverein: Baden, Bavaria, Frankfurt, Hesse-Darmstadt, Hesse-Homburg, Hesse-Kassel, Nassau, Prussia, Reuss-Gera, Reuss-Greiz, Saxe-Altenburg, Saxe-Coburg and Gotha, Saxe-Meiningen, Saxe-Weimar-Eisenach, Saxony, Schwarzburg-Rudolstadt, Schwarzburg-Sondershausen, and Württemberg.

Further standardisation came in 1857, when the Zollverein states and Austria agreed to the Vienna Monetary Treaty. By 1857, the Dresden Convention had also been accepted by Brunswick, Hanover, and Oldenburg. Luxembourg did not accept the Dresden Convention, even though it joined the Zollverein in 1842.
