= Kreuzer =

Historic coin in southern Germany, Austria, and Switzerland

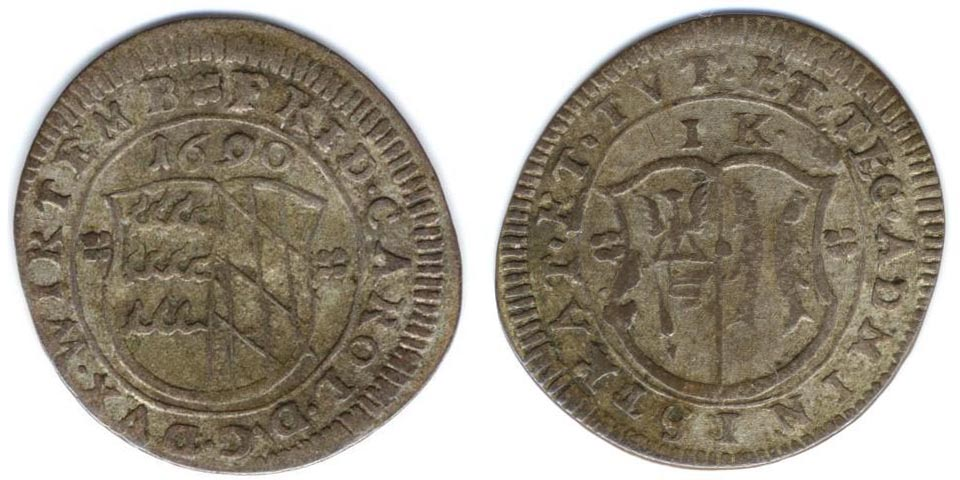
1690 Kreuzer of Friedrich Karl, administrator

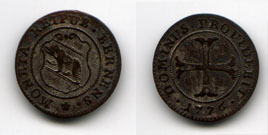
1776 Kreuzer of Bern

The Kreuzer (German: [ˈkʁɔʏtsɐ]), in English also spelled kreutzer (/ˈkrɔɪtsər/ KROYT-sər), was a coin and unit of currency in the southern German states prior to the introduction of the German gold mark in 1871–1873, and in Austria and Switzerland. After 1760 it was made of copper. In south Germany the kreuzer was typically worth 4 Pfennige and there were 60 Kreuzer to a gulden. Kreuzer was abbreviated as Kr, kr, K or Xr.

== Early history ==
The Kreuzer goes back to a Groschen coin minted in Merano in South Tyrol in 1271 (the so-called etscher Kreuzer). Because of the double cross (German: Kreuz) on the face of the coin, it was soon given the name Kreuzer. It spread in the 15th and 16th centuries throughout the south of the German-speaking area. The Imperial Coinage Act of 1551 made them the unit for small silver coins.

In 1559 a value of 60 Kreuzer to 1 Gulden had been adopted throughout the southern states of the Holy Roman Empire, but the northern German states declined to join, and used the Groschen instead of the Kreuzer. The Kreuzer in turn was worth about 4.2 Pfennige (pennies). Thus one (golden) gulden was worth 60 Kreuzer or 252 Pfennige. Later currencies adopted a standard relationship of 240 Pfennige = 60 Kreuzer = 1 Gulden.

== Conventionsmünze ==
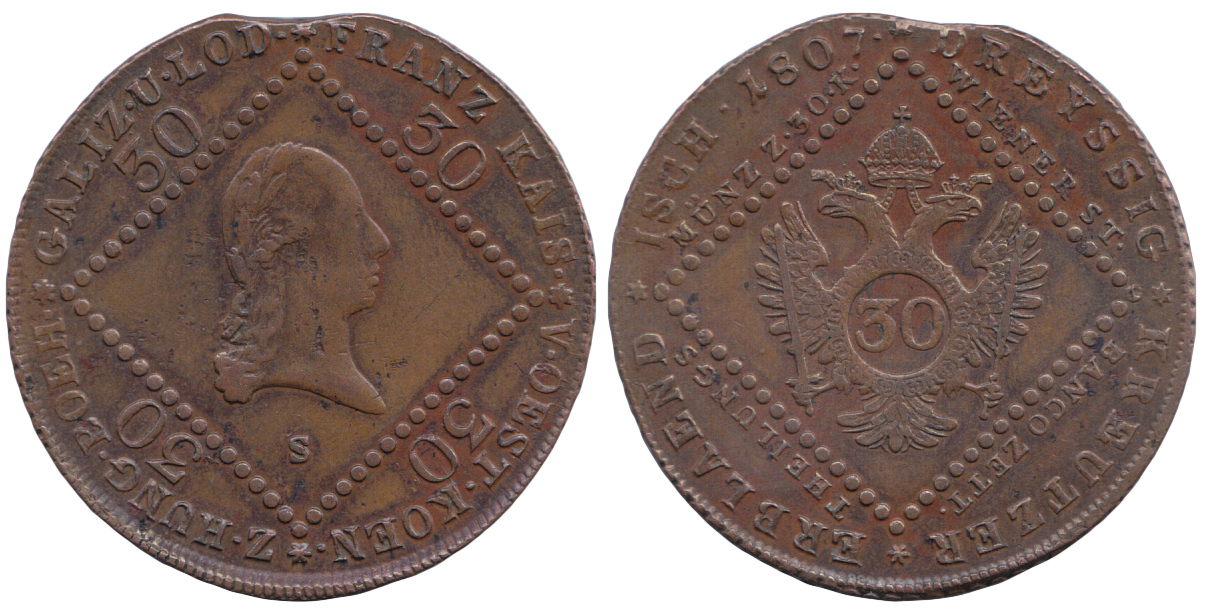
30 Kreutzer of Austria, Franz II, 1807. Copper, weight 18.13 g.

Following the adoption of the Conventionsthaler in 1754, two distinct Kreuzer came into being. The first, sometimes referred to as the Conventionskreuzer, was worth 1/120 of a Conventionsthaler, valuing the Gulden at half a Conventionsthaler. This was used in Austria-Hungary. However, the states of southern Germany adopted a smaller Kreuzer Landmünze worth 1/144 of a Conventionsthaler, thus valuing the Gulden at 5/12 of a Conventionsthaler. In fact, the southern German states issued coins denominated in Kreuzer Landmünze up to 6 Kreuzer Landmünze (equal to 5 Conventionskreuzer), but in Conventionskreuzer for higher denominations.

== South Germany 1837–1873 ==
The South German Currency Union of 1837 used a system of 60 Kreuzer = 1 Gulden and 1 3/4 Gulden = 1 Thaler, with the Kreuzer equal to the old Kreuzer Landmünze. These Kreuzer continued in circulation until decimalization following the unification of Germany in 1871.

== Austria-Hungary 1857–1892 ==
Austria-Hungary decimalized in 1857, adopting a system of 100 Kreuzer = 1 gulden/forint. 1 1/2 florins = 1 Vereinsthaler. The kreuzer was known as krajczár in Hungarian (krajcár in modern orthography), krejcar in Czech, grajciar in Slovak, krajcar in Slovene and Serbocroatian, creițar or crăițar in Romanian, grajcar in Polish.

== See also ==
- Groschen
- Pfennig
