= Gulden =

Gulden is the historical German and Dutch term for gold coin (from Middle High German guldin [pfenni(n)c] "golden penny" and Middle Dutch guldijn florijn "golden florin"), equivalent to the English term guilder.

Gulden, Gülden, Guldens or Gulden's may also refer to:

== Coins or currencies ==
- Guilder, for both the gold and currency gulden
- For the gold gulden:
  - Guilder § gold guilder
  - Rhenish gulden
  - Reichsgulden (disambiguation), one of two 16th-century coins of the Holy Roman Empire
  - Goldgulden: the official "gold Gulden" (as opposed to the silver Guldengroschen) during the 16th century
  - Guldengroschen (Silbergulden): a silver coin defined as having the same value as an actual Gulden
- For European currencies named gulden excluding Switzerland:
  - Guilder
  - Dutch gulden
  - Austro-Hungarian gulden (1754-1892)
  - South German gulden
- For currencies identical to the South German gulden:
  - Baden gulden (1754-1873)
  - Bavarian gulden
  - Württemberg gulden
- For Swiss currencies named gulden:
  - Fribourg gulden
  - Luzern gulden
  - Neuchâtel gulden
  - Schwyz gulden
- Other:
  - Danzig gulden (1923–1939)
  - Florin (gulden in English)
  - Hungarian forint (gulden in Hungarian)
  - Netherlands Indies gulden
  - Netherlands New Guinean gulden
  - Polish złoty (gulden in Polish)

== People ==
- Gülden Kayalar, Turkish volleyball player
- Brad Gulden, former Major League Baseball player
- Errol Gulden, Australian rules footballer
- Gro Gulden, Norwegian mycologist
- Bilal Gülden, Turkish footballer
- Gülden, Turkish singer

== Other ==
- Gulden's, mustard brand named after its creator Charles Gulden
- Guldens, Pennsylvania, an unincorporated community in Adams County
- Gulden Draak, a dark Belgian beer
- 't Gulden Zeepaert, a ship belonging to the Dutch East India Company
