= Reichsmünzfuß =

The Reichsmünzfuß ("Imperial Minting Standard") was a coinage standard or Münzfuß officially adopted for general use in the Holy Roman Empire. Different imperial coin standards were defined for different types of coins.

== History ==
After Charlemagne had introduced his successful Carolingian monetary reform, the high medieval Interregnum led to the collapse of imperial coin sovereignty. At the Reichstag or Imperial Diet in Eger in 1437, an early form of the imperial coinage system was discussed and the first determinations were made in the direction of an imperial coin standard. It was determined that gold coins valid throughout the Reich should only be minted with a fineness of 19 carats (771.6/1000). At that time, no quantitative determinations were made for silver coins.

The imperial diets of 1438 and 1442 under Emperor Frederick III confirmed the provisions of Eger. At the Diet of Worms in 1495, a formal imperial coin standard for gold coins was specified, but not finally decided. Following the earlier example of the gold guilders of the Rhenish Minting Union (Rheinische Münzverein), 107 coins were to be minted from 1 ½ Cologne Marks rauh, i.e. already alloyed. The fineness of the gold alloy used for minting was at 19 carats 6 grains (812.5/1000).

== Examples ==
=== Gold guldens, 1524 ===
When he was elected Emperor, Charles V had promised to organize coinage permanently. After consultations starting in 1521, the Second Imperial Government (Reichsregiment), representing the Emperor, issued the first German Imperial Minting Ordinance (Reichsmünzordnung) in Esslingen. The imperial standard for gold guilders with a fineness of 22 carats (916.7/1000) was 89 pieces minted from the fine Cologne Mark of 22 carats (weight: 2.41 g).

=== Reichsgulden, 1524 ===
For the first time, a general standard for large silver coins was introduced by the Esslingen ordinance. The background was the successful introduction of silver coins, which were meant to correspond to the gold gulden in metal value. The value ratio was about 1:11 at the time. The Tyrolean Guldiner was the first (from 1486); from 1500 onwards the first Saxon Guldengroschen, later called the Klappmützenthaler, minted in Annaberg/Frohnau and probably also in Wittenberg followed. A Saxon Guldengroschen contained 27.40 g of fine silver, since eight coins were to be struck from am alloyed Cologne Mark of 15 lots (Loth) (937.5/1000). In 1505, the fineness was reduced to 14 lots 16 grains (930.6/1000). From 1519, large quantities of the Joachimsthaler Guldengroschen (27.20 g of fine silver) were minted in the north Bohemian town of Joachimsthal based on this standard. The success of this coinage was so great that the abbreviated name Thaler emerged for this type of coin, which then became established internationally for large silver coins (see also Thaler, Rigsdaler, Speciestaler, Dollar).

In the Esslingen coinage regulations, it was laid down that the imperial mint standard for a silver coin called the Reichsgulden was that 8 coins with a fineness of 15 lots (937.5/1000) were to be made from a Mark of alloy Cologne silver. However, the fine silver content was 27.4 g, i.e. 0.2 g higher than the content of the older Saxon and Joachimsthaler Guldengroschen, which were already in circulation in large quantities. This imperial coin standard therefore did not prevail.

=== Reichstaler 1566 ===
The most important imperial coin standard for the coming decades was decided in 1566 at the Imperial Diet of Augsburg. According to the Diet, 8 coins had to be struck from a Cologne Mark of alloy silver; however, the fineness was reduced to 14 lots 4 grains (888.9/1000). This mint standard was identical to the minting of 9 coins from the fine Cologne Mark, since in both cases the fine silver content was 25.98 g. This was thus known as the 9-thaler standard.

== See also ==
- Coinage of Saxony - Imperial thalers
- Leipzig standard
