= Guter Groschen =

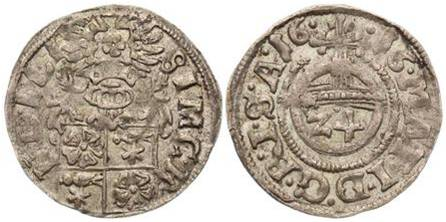
Guter Groschen (1/24 Reichstaler), 1616, also called an Apfelgroschen ("apple groschen") because of the orb

The Guter Groschen ("good groschen"), also Gutergroschen or Gutegroschen, abbreviation Ggr., is name of the groschen coin that was valued at 1/24 of a Reichsthaler from the end of the 16th century. It was called a "good groschen" to distinguish it from the lighter Mariengroschen ("Mary's groschen"), which was only valued at 1/36 Reichsthaler. The term Guter Groschen remained common until the middle of the 19th century.

== History ==
According to the Imperial Circle decision of 1572 the groschen, which depicted an orb on the reverse side, were initially valued at 21 to the Reichsthaler, but later 24. These so-called Apfelgroschen were mainly minted in Northern Germany. During the time of counterfeiting, the Kipper and Wipper period, they were debased. After the Kipper mints were closed, they were minted as Gutegroschen with a higher value. The Groschen name was initially intended to express the return to the Imperial Minting Ordinance (Reichsmünzordnung) and thus to good money. Subsequently, the name also became common for the groschen valued at 1/24 Reichsthaler, which had been struck since the end of the 16th century.

The mints tried to replace the unstable Mariengroschen with the Guter Groschen at 1/24 Reichsthaler, but they continued to circulate as 1/36 Reichsthaler.

In the trade manual, Salomon Haas leicht und deutlich erklärte Waaren-Calculation' of 1769, the relationship of coins to the Guter Groschen is illustrated with examples from Saxony, Brandenburg and Brunswick:

Brandenburg and Saxon coins.
1 Rthl. = 24 Guter Groschen.
1 Guter Groschen = 12 Pfennings.

Brunswick coins.
1 Rthl. = 24 Guter Groschen = 36 Mariengroschen.
1 Guter Groschen = 12 pfennigs.
1 Mariengroschen = 8 pfennigs.

[...] The ratio of the Saxon coins is the same as that of Brandenburg.

== Literature ==
- Paul Arnold, Harald Küthmann, Dirk Steinhilber: Großer Deutscher Münzkatalog von 1800 bis heute. Augsburg 1997
- Lienhard Buck: Die Münzen des Kurfürstentums Sachsen 1763 bis 1806. Berlin 1981
- Heinz Fengler, Gerd Gierow, Willy Unger: transpress Lexikon Numismatik, Berlin 1976, S. 135 Guter Groschen
- Bernd Kluge: Für 8 Groschen ist’s genug. Friedrich der Große in seinen Münzen und Medaillen, Museumsjournal 1/2012
- Wolfgang Leschhorn: Braunschweigische Münzen und Medaillen. 1000 Jahre Münzkunst und Geldgeschichte in Stadt und Land Braunschweig, Appelhans-Verlag 2010, S. 199–202, ISBN 978-3-941737-22-8.
- Friedrich Freiherr von Schrötter (ed.), mit N. Bauer, K. Regling, A. Suhle, R. Vasmer, J. Wilcke: Wörterbuch der Münzkunde, de Gruyter, Berlin 1970 (reprint of the 1930 original)
- Arthur Suhle: Die Münze. Von den Anfängen bis zur europäischen Neuzeit, Leipzig 1969
