= Bauerngroschen =

Coin

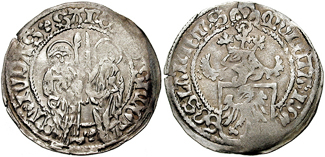
Bauerngroschen, undated, end of 15th century, inscription: GOSLARIENS on the side of the coat of arms (2.84 g; 28 mm diameter; silver)

The Bauerngroschen, also Burgroschen (Low German: Buur, "farmer"), was a groschen minted in the Free Imperial City of Goslar from 1477 until at least 1490 and continued to circulate until the 16th century. On the obverse it depicts a coat of arms with an imperial eagle beneath a helmet with a crown and on the reverse Saints, Simon and Jude. The two apostles were thought by the people to be farmers due to the poor quality stamping of the coins, hence the name, Bauerngroschen ("farmer's groschen").

== Description ==
At the end of the 15th century, the Bauerngroschen minted in the Imperial City of Goslar contained 2.2 g of fine silver for a gross weight of 2.92 g. The groschen was worth 12 Goslar or Hildesheim pfennigs. At a minting convention in 1490 it was decided that a gulden should be worth 13 Goslar bauerngroschen each of 12 pfennigs.

=== Obverse ===
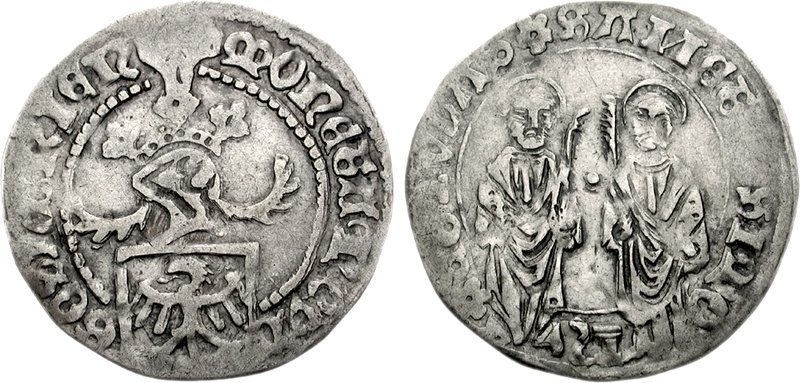
Bauerngroschen, c. 1477/1481, undated (2.61 g; 28 mm diameter; silver)

The obverse shows the coat of arms of the city of Goslar with a simple imperial eagle, above which is a crown with a plume

- Caption: MONETA NOVA – GOSLARIEN(sis) (in monastic script) – in the picture above with GOSLARIENS
  - Translation: Goslar's new coin

=== Reverse ===
On the left. the apostle Jude with a club, on the right the apostle Simon with a saw.

- Caption: SANCTVS SIMON – ET IVDAS
  - Translation: Saints Simon and Judas

== Historical background ==
In Christian tradition, the saints, Simon the Zealot and Jude the Apostle, whose images were thought by the population to be farmers on the Late Medieval silver groschen, were two of the twelve apostles of Jesus Christ. According to one version of his manner of death, Simon was sawn up and Jude was beaten with a club. The saw is recognizable as Simon's emblem on the Bauerngroschen and is held like a staff. The club of Jude on the pfennigs is sometimes also referred to as a staff. Simon is regarded as the patron of woodcutters, while Jude had no special saintly role for a long time, as he was often confused with Judas, who betrayed Christ for 30 silver coins. "The unemployed St. Jude," says Hans Herrli, "therefore had enough time and leisure to devote himself to unusually difficult and time-consuming problems."

According to Karl Christoph Schmieder, the Bauernpfennigs were minted in the imperial city of Goslar. But he explains that their depiction of the apostles, Simon and Jude, suggests:

that these pfennigs were not minted [...] by the city council, [but] by the Free Imperial Chapter of St. Simon and Judas in Goslar. They are minted poorly enough that [people] took their halos for caps, their […] sprigs for clubs and they themselves for Harz farmers, and that's where the old name "Bauerngroschen" comes from.

— Karl Christoph Schmieder, Handwörterbuch der gesammten Münzkunde … (1811), pp. 43/44.

However, Schmieder also states that the groschen was minted around 1350, which contradicts the current evidence that it was minted from 1477.

The Association of Scholars (1839), Leitzmann's Numismatic Newspaper (1842), K. G. Ritter von Schultheß-Rechberg (1846) and others also name the Imperial Chapter (Reichsstift) as mint lord for these coins. Accordingly, they "probably more correctly" belonged to the abbey of that name and not to the city of Goslar.

Both the imperial city of Goslar and the Palatine abbey of St. Simon and Judas had access to the rich silver mines of the Rammelsberg. Currently, the municipal mint of Goslar is usually given as the mint. Sometimes the city is mentioned as mint owner.

The municipal mint of Goslar, first mentioned in a document in 1331, was active until 1764. It obtained its silver from the nearby Rammelsberg mountain.

There is conflicting evidence as to whether the groschen popularly called the Bauerngroschen was minted by the city or the free imperially immediate Palatine Abbey of St. Simon and St. Jude. What is certain is that the Bauerngroschen were minted in Goslar. Early city coins were the so-called Matthiaspfennigs (bracteates) minted from about 1436, the Matthiasgroschen also called Matthier (from c. 1470/71), then the Mariengroschen and the Körtlinge, which were a type of groschen (= Kurzling), which was minted from 1552 to 1555. The city also had thalers minted from 1531.

== Literature ==
- Heinz Fengler, Gerd Gierow, Willy Unger: transpress Lexikon Numismatik, Berlin, 1976
- Helmut Kahnt: Das große Münzlexikon von A bis Z, Regenstauf, 2005
- Wolfgang Leschhorn: Braunschweigische Münzen und Medaillen. 1000 Jahre Münzkunst und Geldgeschichte in Stadt und Land Braunschweig., Appelhans-Verlag 2010, ISBN 978-3-941737-22-8, pp. 88-91.
- Karl Christoph Schmieder: Handwörterbuch der gesammten Münzkunde …, Halle and Berlin 1811
- Bernd Schneidmüller: Das Goslarer Pfalzstift St. Simon und Judas und das deutsche Königtum in staufischer Zeit, Hanover 1993
- Friedrich von Schrötter, N. Bauer, K. Regling, A. Suhle, R. Vasmer, J. Wilcke: Wörterbuch der Münzkunde, Berlin 1970 (reprint of the original edition from 1930)
