= Reichsgulden =

Reichsgulden was an official coin of the Holy Roman Empire in the 16th century, issued in two, officially equivalent, forms:

- the Goldgulden
- the Guldengroschen

== See also ==
- Gulden (disambiguation)
- Reichsmünzordnung
