= Münzfuß =

Historical coinage standard

A Münzfuß (lit. 'coin foot' or 'mint foot') is an historical term, used especially in the Holy Roman Empire, for an official minting or coinage standard that determines how many coins of a given type were to be struck from a specified unit of weight of precious metal (the Münzgrundgewicht or coin base weight). The Münzfuß, or Fuß ("foot") for short in numismatics, determined a coin's fineness, i.e. how much of a precious metal it would contain. Mintmaster Julian Eberhard Volckmar Claus defined the standard in his 1753 work, Kurzgefaßte Anleitung zum Probieren und Münzen ("Brief Guide to Proving and Coining"), as follows: "The appropriate proportion of metals and the weight of the coin, measured according to their internal and external worth, or determined according to their quality, additives and fineness, number and weight, is called the Münzfuß."

Many coins do not consist exclusively of the precious metal that the respective standard is based on. Gold and silver coins are often alloyed with copper for, e.g. coin hardening. A distinction is therefore made between the fine weight (or fineness or grain) of a coin and its total weight (gross weight, German: Schrot or Rau(h)gewicht) of the coin's planchet. For example, the term Fine Mark is used when the pure precious metal content of a Mark weight is meant. The term Mark rauh ("rough Mark") was the weight of alloyed coin metal that contained exactly one Mark fein ("fine Mark").

A drop in the standard of precious metal coins is referred to as debasement (Münzverschlechterung). A distinction must be made between the continuous deterioration of coins in circulation due to abrasion and the debasement of coins by issuing of new ones with a lower fine weight.

== Historical coin standards ==
=== Ancient coin standards ===
The oldest coin standard is the Aeginetic standard of the island of Aegina, which led to a stater weight (1 stater corresponds to 2 drachmas) of approx. 12.3 g (thus 6.15 g per drachma).). It spread across the Peloponnese, the Cyclades Islands, Crete and southwest Asia Minor.

Almost every polis initially had its own currency. From the 5th century BC, due to the importance of Athens in Greek trade, the Attic standard prevailed, with a tetradrachm weight of approx. 17.5 g. The stater was therefore approximately 8.75 and the drachm about 4.38 g.

The denarius of the Roman Republic, at 3.9 g (1/84 of the Roman pound, which was the coin base weight, was thus approx. 327.4 g) was initially based on the Greek drachma of the Attic standard. It was reduced to 3.3 g in the Roman Empire by Nero. After further debasements, Diocletian's coin reform of 294 AD replaced the denarius with the argenteus with a target weight of 3.41g. It was equal to 1/96 of the Roman pound.

=== Medieval and modern coin standards ===
==== Carolingian pound ====
In the Carolingian monetary system, the pound was the basic unit of mass. It was stipulated that from one pound of silver, 240 pfennigs (denari) should be coined. The number 240 resulted from 20 schillings (solidi) of 12 pfennigs each. A similar classification existed in Great Britain until the 20th century.

==== Cologne Mark ====
In the early modern era, the Mark replaced the pound as a unit of weight in the Roman-German Empire.

- With the Augsburg Imperial Coin Edict of 30 May 1566, the 9 Thaler standard was introduced, which stipulated that 9 Reichsthaler should be minted from 1 Cologne Mark of silver and that the silver content should be 14 Loths and 4 Gräns (888.888 ‰). This results in a weight of 29.23 g for the individual coin and a fine weight of 25.98 g.
- The 9 Thaler standard was also retained by the participating states of the 1667 Zinna Coinage Treaty resulting in the Speciesreichsthaler. However, the smaller denominations were to be minted to a 10½ Thaler standard. From 1668, the subdivisions of the Thaler were also minted to this lesser standard. The Saxon Kurantthaler to the Zinna standard was actually a coin of account that did not exist as an actual coin, but was intended to simplify accounting. In individual cases it was nevertheless minted.
- In 1670 and 1671, Electoral Saxony had Wechselthalers minted to the Wechselthaler standard to favour Leipzig trade.
- With the Leipzig Coinage Treaty concluded on 16 January 1690, Electoral Brandenburg, Electoral Saxony and the Duchy of Brunswick-Lüneburg agreed on a 12 Thaler standard for the subdivisions of the Thaler (also known as the 18 Gulden standard or Leipzig standard), which quickly prevailed in most German states. This standard was issued under Emperor Charles VI through his Imperial Commission Decree of 1 December 1738, Reichsmünzfuß für Talerteilstücke ("Imperial Standard for Subdivisions of the Thaler").
- In 1750 the Conventionsthaler was introduced in Austria, of which ten pieces were minted from a fine Mark, which corresponded to a fine weight of 23.386 g. In the 18th and 19th centuries, the relative percentage of precious metal was often indicated as a Roman numeral at the bottom of the coin. E.g. an X (Roman numeral 10) means that ten coins of this type correspond to one Mark of pure silver.
- For example, the (penultimate) last Prussian Kurantthaler and also the Thalers of the other German states that had been minted to the 14 Thaler standard since the Dresden Coinage Treaty of 1838 bore the inscription: EIN THALER XIV EINE F. M., i.e. that 14 Thaler coins contained 1 Mark weight of silver, which corresponded to 233.8555 g of fine silver. This 14 Thaler standard was introduced into Prussia by Johann Philipp Graumann in 1750 on behalf of King Frederick II.

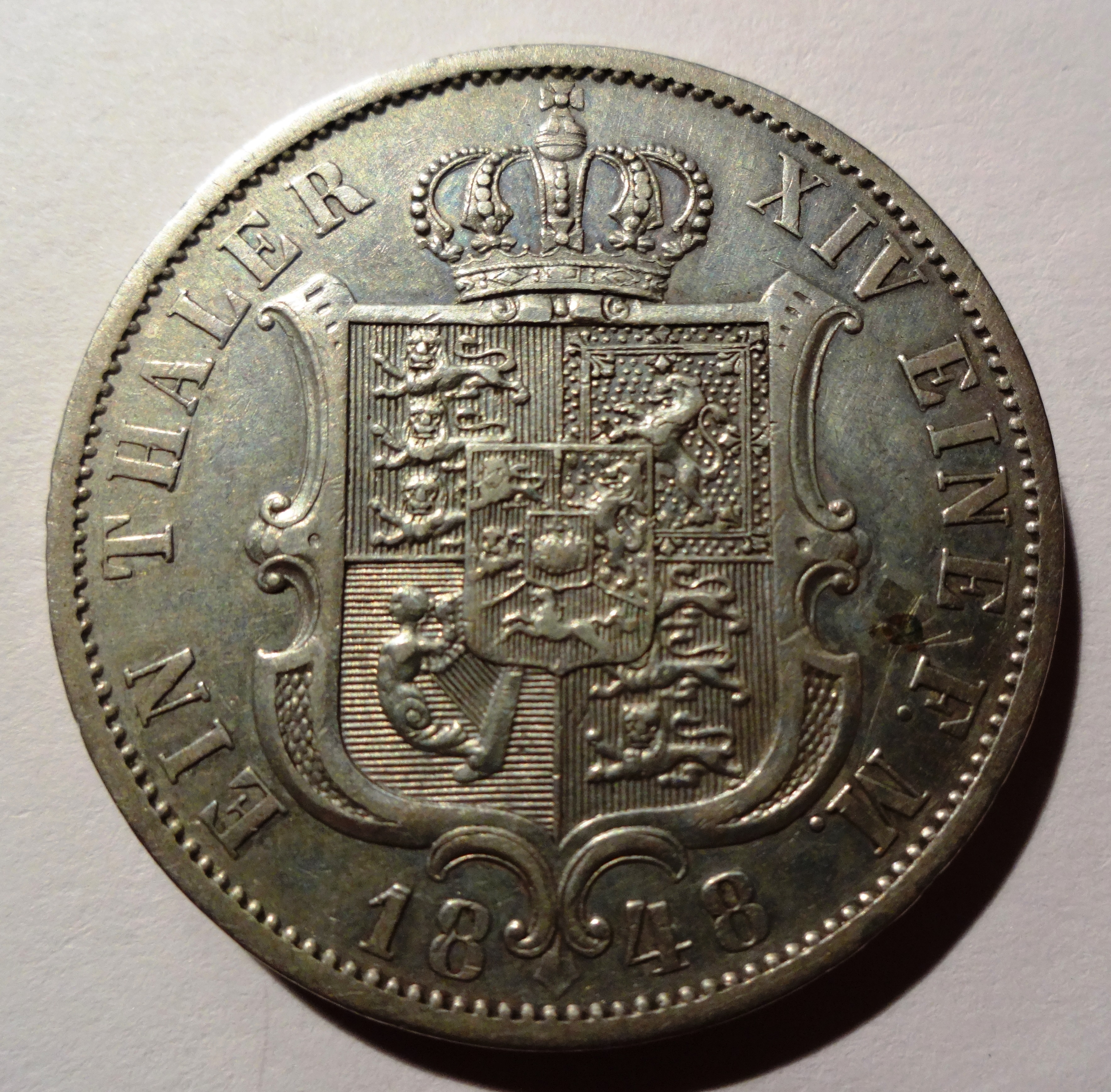
Coin standard (14 Thaler standard) on an 1846 Hanoverian Thaler

==== Zollpfund ====
As part of a trend towards decimal currency systems, the Vienna Coinage Treaty replaced the Cologne Mark with its coin base weight of 233.855g, by the Zollpfund ("customs pound") with a weight of 500g. Since the 14 Thaler standard was replaced by a 30 Thaler standard at the same time, the silver fine weight hardly changed.

==== Change to gold standard ====
Towards the end of the 19th century, silver was replaced as the basis of currency in many countries by the gold standard and the coin standards now referred to the more valuable and durable gold.

In 1871, the Mark was introduced into the German Empire, under which 5, 10 and 20 mark coins were minted in gold. However, due to the economic consequences of the First World War it was completely devalued. Following the years of hyperinflation, the German Coinage Act of 30 August 1924 stipulated, in connection with the gold coinage of the German Empire, that from a kilogram of fine gold 139½ 20 Reichsmark coins or 279 10 Reichsmark coins would be struck, each having a ratio of 900 parts gold to 100 parts copper. These were never actually produced.

== See also ==
- Hochrandpfennigs were based on the Münzfuß of the Carolingian coinage reform
- Bankothalers were based on the Burgundian standard
- Konventionsfuß, Kurantmünze, Bimetallism
- Wechselthaler
- Leipzig standard
