= Apfelgroschen =

Historical German coin

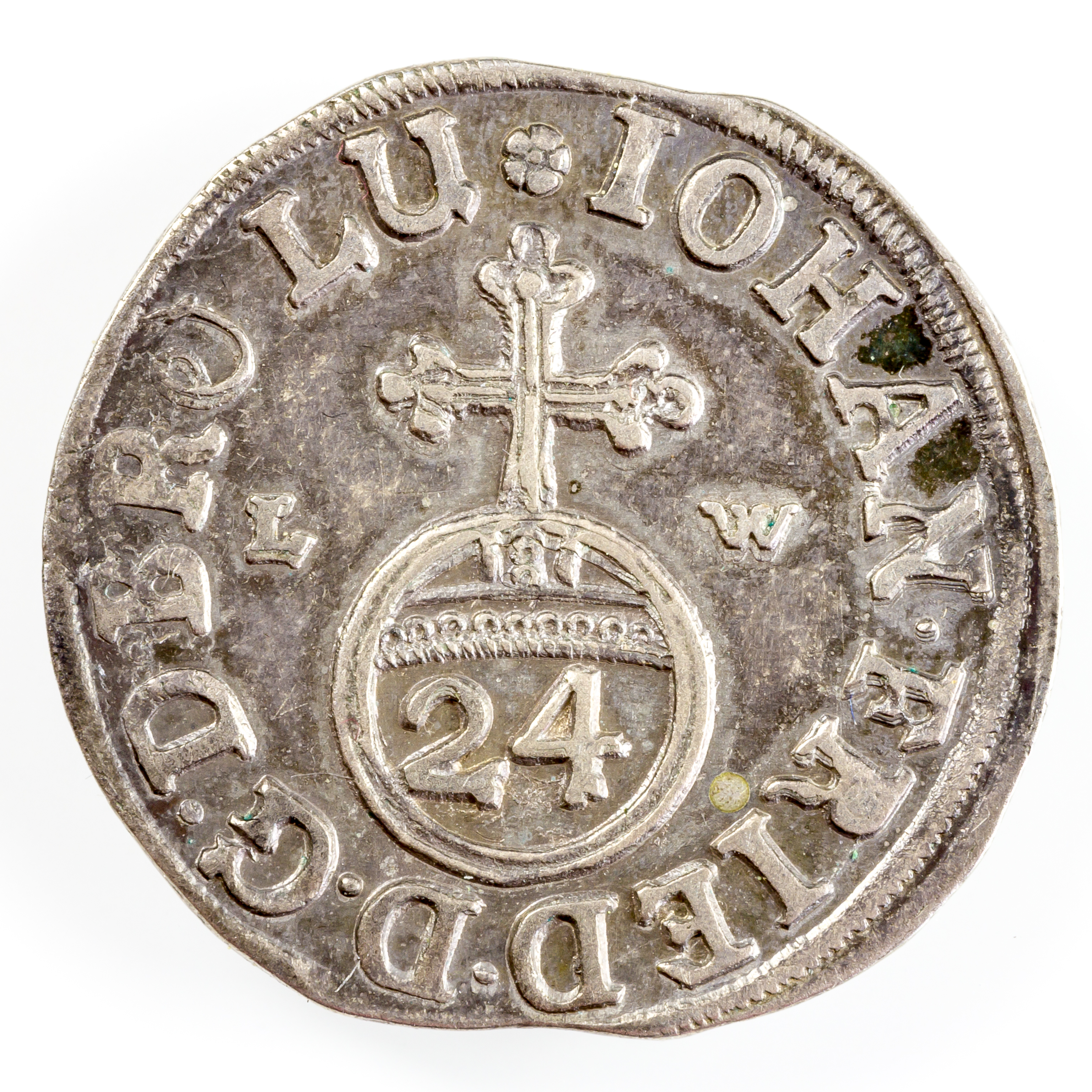
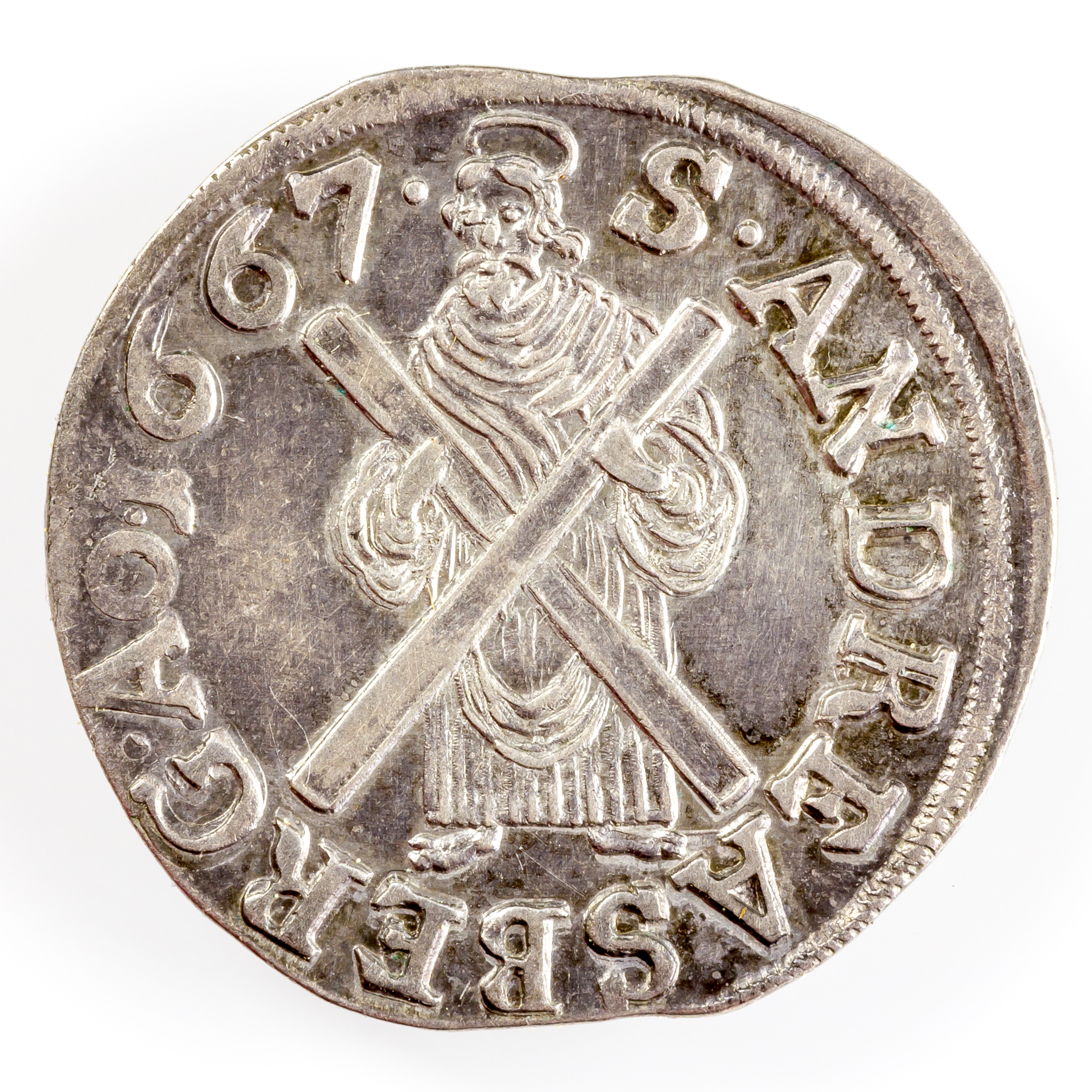
Apfelgroschen = 1/24 Reichsthaler, Principality of Calenberg, John Frederick, 1667 (Welter 1802)

The Apfelgroschen is a historical German coin that was a type of Guter Groschen ("good groschen"). It was minted from about 1570 and was so called because it depicted the imperial orb (Reichsapfel, literally "imperial apple") with the inscription "24" (i. e. 24 pieces = 1 Reichsthaler) on one side.
