= Reichsguldiner =

Coin

The Reichsguldiner, Reichsguldener or Guldenthaler was a large silver coin issued under the second Augsburg Imperial Minting Ordinance (Reichsmünzordnung) of 1559. The Reichsguldiner was to have a value of 60 kreuzers and be minted from a silver alloy of 930.5/1000 with a gross weight of 24.6 g. The reverse of the coin was to bear the double-headed Imperial Eagle and an Imperial Orb with the denomination 60.

The introduction of the Reichsguldiner actually only took place in the south-west German regions. The Electorate of Saxony, which was rich in silver deposits, and the northern, western and central German imperial estates did not mint Reichsguldiners. Instead, they stayed with the thaler that had already been introduced there. In the subsequent minting ordinance of 1566, the thaler was established instead of the Reichsguldiner as the official large silver coin of the Holy Roman Empire (see Reichstaler).

== See also ==
- Illustration of a Nuremberg Reichsguldiner dating to 1641

== Literature ==
- Tyll Kroha: Reichsguldiner. Lexikon der Numismatik. Bertelsmann-Lexikonverlag, Gütersloh 1977, p. 363.
- Tyll Kroha: Augsburger Reichsmünzordnung(en). Lexikon der Numismatik. Bertelsmann-Lexikonverlag, Gütersloh 1977. p. 43.
