= Bank of Hamburg =

Bank in Hamburg, Germany (1619–1875)

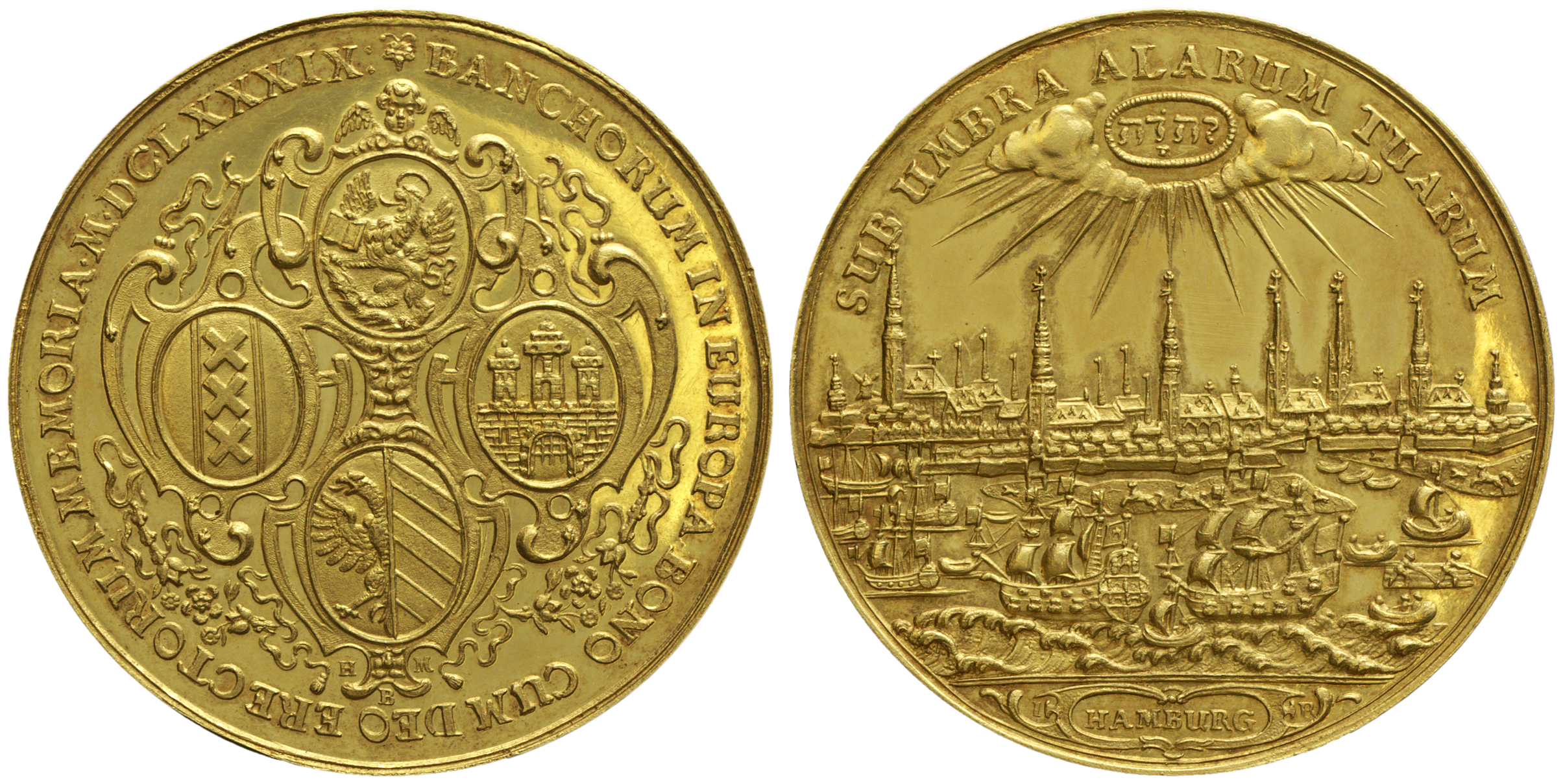
Coin issued by the Bank of Hamburg in 1665, displaying its arms together with those of the Bank of Amsterdam, Bank of Nuremberg, and Venetian Banco del Giro. The Latin inscription translates as: "1665 commemoration of the banks established in Europe with the benevolence of God". The other side shows the Hamburg harbor and skyline under God represented by the Tetragrammaton. The Latin inscription translates as: "Under the shadow of Your wings"

The Bank of Hamburg (German: Hamburger Bank) was a public credit institution founded in 1619 by the Free City of Hamburg. It issued a fully silver-backed currency known as the Mark Banco, which was used to stabilize trade and protect against debased coinage. It operated independently until 31 December 1875, when it became part of the newly created Reichsbank.

== History ==
The Hamburg City Council made the decision to create the bank in February 1619, following lengthy negotiations with its civic stakeholders. It was intended to improve monetary stability in the context of the Kipper und Wipper episode of German monetary turmoil, and to simplify trade between merchants; its model was the Bank of Amsterdam which had been founded a decade earlier. The numerous English merchant adventurers, Portuguese Sephardi Jews and Dutch religious refugees living in Hamburg at the time brought their capital and knowledge to the bank, thus contributing to its initial success.

The bank was administered free of charge by two senators, two City elders (Oberalten), two "treasury citizens" (Kammereibürger) and five "bank citizens" (Bancobürger), namely citizens who had an account at the bank. This system of oversight by account holders and civic leaders helped maintain public trust and limited government interference. The bank's premises were in Hamburg City Hall. To open an account at the bank, one had to bring an initial amount of at least 400 Lübeck Marks. In addition, regulations were issued that prohibited bills of exchange and private trade in metallic money, and bills of exchange over 400 Lübeck Marks had to be processed through the Bank of Hamburg.

On 20 November 1619, Lehnbanco was founded as a department of the bank. It gave loans against collateral to merchants as well as to the City of Hamburg itself. The Bank of Hamburg was also assigned the municipal mint and the municipal grain warehouse, but these still had independently accounting. From 1725 to 1736, the Courantbank was set up as a subdivision of the Bank of Hamburg, with the aim to counteract massive currency debasement at the time. Courant is an old word for currency.

The Bank of Hamburg held a reputation for good governance and integrity. It pursued conservative policies, refused to debase its currency, and prioritized security deposits over lending expansion. These principles are cited as early examples of sound money practices. German economist Paul Jacob Marperger described it as follows:

The world-famous bank, which is better than any bank in the world in terms of purity of its bank money, as it has conserved the old and just [...] Reichstaler and has not tolerated any inferior ones [...] The bank is run by agile and faithful people [...] The order and diligence with which they conduct their operations is admirable, and every day large sums are deposited and withdrawn in a more straightforward manner than with Italian banks. Whoever comes to the bank and asks for example what moneys have been transferred to his account on the previous day will be given clear answers.

— P.J. Marperger, Beschreibung der Banquen (1717), translated by Ulrich Bindseil

The Savary brothers made similar observations:

[...] although the size of this bank is not as considerable as the one in Amsterdam, the fidelity and exactness with which everything is being done there have given it a great reputation throughout Europe, and in the North.

— Jacques & Louis-Philémon Savary, Dictionnaire universel de commerce (1750), translated by Ulrich Bindseil

The bank weathered successive crises with various degrees of success. Unsecured loans were a fundamental problem. In 1770 the bank was comprehensively reformed. During the era of Napoleonic rule in Hamburg, the bank was looted and hit hard by economic crisis, but it survived.

The Bank of Hamburg ceased to be a stand-alone entity following the Unification of Germany and was converted into a branch of the newly created Reichsbank at the end of 1875.

== Units of account ==
The bank's unit of account was the Reichsthaler banco, worth 3 Hamburg mark banco or 48 schillings banco. On the date of the bank's foundation, this Bankothaler corresponded to the fine silver weight of the Reichsthaler based on the Imperial Minting Standard (Reichsmünzfuß) of 1566.

Similar to the Bank of Amsterdam, the Bank of Hamburg was established in 1619 in order to guarantee the full silver equivalent of the German Empire's Reichsthaler despite the ensuing crises of the Thirty Years' War and the resulting Kipper und Wipper financial crisis. While originally defined as 1/9th a Cologne Mark of fine silver (or 25.984 g silver), Amsterdam's more extensive operations meant that its Dutch rijksdaalder's slightly lower standard of 25.4 g silver prevailed (hence, 8.46 g silver per Mark Banco). Silver received from depositors were converted in the books in reichsthalers banco of 3 marks or 48 schillings credited to their accounts (or Folium). From there they could make cashless payments to other account holders with full confidence of payment in the right quantity of silver.

Since the Reichsthaler Banco was viewed as stable in value, it was used in wholesale and mortgage loans, and merchants carried their books in Thalers and Marks Banco. Rates for other currencies and goods were published regularly, the most important of which is the daily exchange rate of gold coins or bullion into silver standard marks banco. The reichsthaler banco of Hamburg and Amsterdam was also equal in value to the Danish rigsdaler specie and the Norwegian rigsdaler specie.

In 1770 the bank's currency unit was modified so that a Cologne Mark of silver made 9 1/4 reichsthalers banco or 27 3/4 marks banco (hence, 25.28 g fine silver per reichsthaler or 8.43 g per mark), or 59 1/3 marks banco per Zollpfund (Customs Pound of 500 g fine silver). The Reichsthaler Banco was worth 1.5169 Vereinsthalers of 16 2/3 g fine silver introduced by the Vienna Monetary Treaty of 1857.

At the time of German currency unification in 1875, the new currency was named Mark (the German gold mark), as a comparatively neutral choice to replace the various southern Guilders and northern Thalers, and to accommodate sensitivities in Hamburg about the disappearance of the celebrated local bank. Hamburg's currency was retired at 1 mark banco = 1.5 German marks and 1 reichsthaler banco = 4.5 German gold marks. The German national currency would retain the name Mark, inherited from the Bank of Hamburg, until its replacement by the euro.

== Namesake ==
On 24 July 1861 a cooperative bank was founded with a similar name, the "Hamburger Bank von 1861 Volksbank eG". It is now known as Hamburger Volksbank.

== See also ==
- List of central banks
- German public banking sector
- List of banks in Germany
