= Wechselthaler =

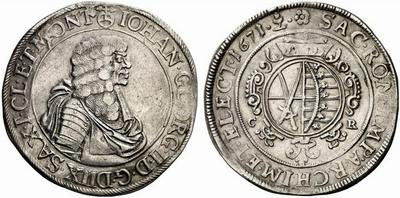
Wechselthaler from 1671, mmz. C–R and acorn, mintmaster Constantin Rothe, Dresden Mint

The Wechselthaler, also spelt Wechseltaler or Wechsel-Thaler ("exchange thaler"), was minted in 1670 and 1671 in the Electorate of Saxony under Elector John George II (1656–1680) to the Wechselthaler or Burgundian thaler standard (861/1000 fineness). As the name suggests, the Wechselthaler and its subdivisions were intended as a currency to encourage Leipzig's trade with Hamburg and the Netherlands. The first coins from 1670 therefore bear the inscription WECHSELTHALER on the reverse. The Wechselthaler standard was only valid in Electoral Saxony in 1670 and 1671.

== History ==
Thanks to the trade fairs, thalers from the provinces of the Netherlands minted to the Burgundian standard, arrived in Saxony via the trade route to Leipzig. These coins were indeed better than the Electoral Saxon ones, which were minted to the national currency standard of the Treaty of Zinna, but of lower quality than the Speciesreichsthaler coins minted to the Imperial Coin Standard. Nevertheless, they were considered equivalent to the Saxon Speciesreichstaler.

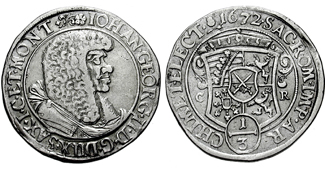
1/3 Kuranttaler, 1672. The 1/3 thaler in Zinna currency had a face value of 8 Groschen, but was only valid in Hamburg at 7 Groschen

The 1/3 Thalers, on the other hand, were of lower value. According to the Zinna treaty, they had a face value of 8 groschen, but were only accepted in Hamburg at a rate of 7 groschen.

Electoral Saxon Speciesreichstaler, Kuranttaler (a coin of account from the Treaty of Zinna), and thaler pieces issued to the Burgundian standard had the following differences in value:

- Valuation of the Speciesreichstaler in Zinna currency:
  - 1 Speciesreichsthaler = 1 1/6 Kurantthaler = 28 groschen, 9 pieces to a Mark Fine silver, Fine weight = 25.98 g
- Value of the Kuranttaler (coin of account):
  - 1 Kurantthaler = 24 groschen, valued at 10 1/2 pieces to a Mark of fine silver, fine weight = 22.27 g (coined denominations were 2/3-, 1/3-, 1/6 thalers, groschen, Dreier and pfennigs.)
- Value of the Thaler minted to the Burgundian standard:
  - Thaler struck at 9.67 pieces to a Mark of fine silver, fine weight = 24.19 g

The thalers of the Dutch provinces were worth 26 groschen in Zinna currency, the Speciesreichstalers as mentioned above 28 groschen. Since thalers minted to the Burgundian standard were accepted as a full Reichstaler, there were protests from the Leipzig merchants, who were supported by the Electoral Saxon estates. They suggested to the elector that he himself should have the Burgundian standard minted.

This is the origin and the intention of a monetary coinage that is deliberately distinguished from other thalers by the employment of the name Wechselthaler [...] which has been very puzzling to coin researchers in the past, [...]. g) Johann Jakob Vogel [...] notes on p. 750: that the Wechselthalers were (first) coined in 1670, that they were equal in value to the Burgundian thalers, and that they were accepted in exchange [end of note]. Immediately after the closed Landtage in March 1670, a start was made with its minting.

— Friederich Klotzsch, Versuch einer Chur-Sächsischen Münzgeschichte

With the decree of 3 March 1670, the Wechselthaler standard, which corresponded to the Burgundian standard, was introduced in the Electorate of Saxony. Afterwards, minting was only carried out in the years 1670 and 1671 according to accounts from the Dresden Mint.

== Description ==
The Wechselthalers were coined as whole, half- and quarter-thalers. Thalers with almost the same design were struck in the Dresden Mint. Some of those minted in 1671 had slight changes in the bust and the shape of the coat of arms. But there are also double, triple, and quadruple Wechselthalers, which are extremely rare. The inscription WECHSELTHALER on the back was only used in the first two quarters of 1670. The majority of thalers were minted without this inscription but with the same general design. The obverse bears the armoured bust of John George II and part of his titular inscription. The orb is above the ruler's head. The reverse shows the simplified Saxon coat of arms under the electoral hat and the rest of his titular inscription, the year and the mintmaster acorn, as well as the initials C - R of Dresden mintmaster, Constantin Rothe.

The dies of the first thalers were apparently still cut by Johann Caspar Höckner. The following die were probably made by Ernst Caspar Dürr, who was given to the coin cutter Höckner as adjunct at the end of 1670.

=== Inscription ===
IOHAN(nes). GEORG(ius). II. D(ei). G(ratia). DUX. SAX(oniae). I(uliaci). CL(iviae). ET. MONT(ium). // SAC(ri). ROME(ani). IMP(erii). ARCHIM(arschallus). ET. ELECT(or).

John George II, by the Grace of God Duke of Saxony, Jülich, Cleves and Berg, of the Holy Roman Empire Arch-Marshal and Elector.

=== Wechseltaler standard ===
Table based on Arnold & Schwinkowski

Nominal	Piece/Mixed Mark	g/Mixed Mark	Piece/Mark of fine silver	g/Mark of fine silver	Fineness (lot, grain = 0/00)
Wechselthaler	8.33	28.06	9.67	24.19	13 lots, 14 grains = 861.11 ‰
1/2 Wechselthaler	16.67	14.03	19.33	12.1	13 lots, 14 grains = 861.11 ‰
1/4 Wechselthaler	33.33	7.02	38.67	6.05	13 lots, 14 grains = 861.11 ‰

== See also ==
- Saxon coin history

== Literature ==
- Walther Haupt: Saxon Coinage, German Publisher of Sciences, Berlin 1974
- Paul Arnold: The Saxon taler currency from 1500 to 1763, Swiss numismatic review, volume 59, 1980
- Paul Arnold: "Walter Haupt und seine 'Sächsische Münzkunde'". In: Numismatische Hefte. No. 20, Dresden 1986.
- Friedrich von Schrötter (ed.), with N. Bauer, K. Regling, A. Suhle, R. Vasmer, J. Wilcke: Dictionary of numismatics, de Gruyter, Berlin 1970 (reprint of the original edition from 1930)
- Heinz Fengler, Gerd Gierow, Willy Unger: "Transpress Encyclopedia Numismatics", Berlin 1976
- Johann Friederich Klotzsch: Attempt at a Chur-Saxon coin history. From the earliest times to the present day. First part. Chemnitz 1779, p. 620
- Julius Erbstein, Albert Erbstein: Discussions in the field of Saxon coin and medal history when describing Hofrath Engelhardt'sche collection, Dresden 1888
