= Speciesthaler =

Silver coin

The Speciesthaler, also Speciestaler or Speziestaler, was a type of silver specie coin that was widespread from the 17th to the 19th century and was based on the 9-Thaler standard of the original Reichsthaler. In Scandinavian sources the term Speciesdaler is used and, in German sources, the abbreviation Species was also common.

== General ==
The 1566 Imperial Minting Ordinance of the Holy Roman Empire stipulated that 9 Reichsthalers were to be coined a fine Cologne Mark of silver (ca. 234 g). The official Reichstaler to the 9-Thaler standard thus had a calculated fine silver content of 25.984 g.

Speciestaler was a common name in (Northern) Germany and Scandinavia in the 18th and 19th centuries. The suffix -taler goes back to the Joachimstaler Guldengroschen. The prefix Species- goes back to the Latin word species, "face" or, in Middle Latin, "bust image". Speciesthalers are mostly silver coins with an embossed head or bust image of the mint owner. There are examples here from the Dresden Mint and Leipzig Mint The Speciesthalers from Hamburg featured the city coat of arms instead of a bust.

== Regional characteristics ==
=== Holy Roman Empire ===
==== Lübeck and Hamburg ====
In 1619, the Reichstaler to a 9-Thaler standard was designated as a value-stable accounting unit of the Hamburger Bank and referred to as the Bankothaler or Banco-Thaler. From 1622, the Reichstaler was the common basis of the Mark and Schilling currencies in Hamburg and Lübeck. From then, the Reichsthaler was divided into exactly three Marks.

Between 1730 and 1764 around 110,000 such Speciesthalers were minted in Hamburg (fineness 888 ^{8}/_{9}; gross weight 29.2 g). The mintings from 1730 and 1735 bear the inscription Moneta Nova, a reference to the Imperial Minting Ordinance. On the Speciesthalers minted from 1761-1764 it is ao noted that there are 48 Schilling Species. The naming of Schilling Species was necessary because the silver content of the Hamburg Schillings which were part of the Schilling Hamburger Current (Hamburger Kurantgeld) introduced in 1725 was only 5/6 of the Schilling Species.

==== Other areas ====
- Hanover: Speciesthaler (1738–1802) in ^{8}/_{9} fineness based on the 9-Thaler standard
- Austria
  - Fine Convention Species Thaler (fineness 24.808 instead of 25.984 g) in ^{5}/_{6} fineness (10 Speciesthaler from the crude Vienna Mark or 10 from the fine Vienna Cologne Mark)
  - from 1852 onwards in ^{9}/_{10} fineness

=== Denmark with Schleswig and Holstein ===
- from before 1619 Speciesdaler (4 Rigsmarkers at 20 Skillinger Currentmönt) to the 9 1/4 Thaler standard
- from 1776 only Species; in the Duchies of Schleswig and Holstein from 1788 = 60 Schillings Schleswig-Holstein Courant
- Species, Rigsdaler Species and Speciesdaler were minted from 1800 to 1808 under Christian VII, from about 1825 to 1838 under Frederick VI and 1848/49 under Frederick VII.

=== Poland ===
- from 1697 Convention Specie Thaler (divided into 8 Złote polski) based on the Viennese 10 Thaler standard in ^{5}/_{6} fineness
- 1787–1791 Fineness reduced to ^{13}/_{16}

=== Other countries ===
- Norway: from 1814 Speciedaler of 7/8 fineness (5 Rigsort to 24 Skilling)

== Literature ==
- Jäger, Kurt (1971). Die Münzprägungen der deutschen Staaten vor Einführung der Reichswährung. Nordwestdeutschland, Vol. 6, Basle: Münzen- und Medaillen AG.
