= Guilder =

Former European currency

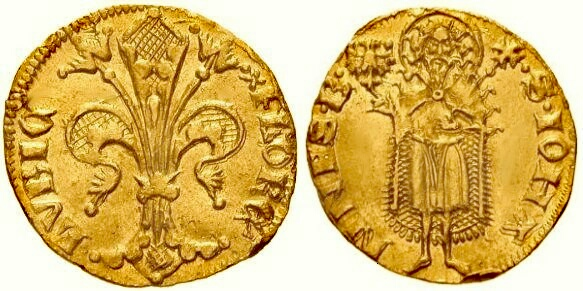
Florence gulden (1341)

Guilder is the English translation of the Dutch and German gulden, originally shortened from Middle High German guldin pfenninc ("gold penny"). This was the term that became current in the southern and western parts of the Holy Roman Empire for the Fiorino d'oro (introduced in 1252 in the Republic of Florence). Hence, the name has often been interchangeable with florin (currency sign ƒ or fl.). In Hungary it is called forint.

The guilder is also the name of several currencies used in Europe and the former colonies of the Dutch Empire.

== Gold guilder ==
The guilder or gulden was the name of several gold coins used during the Holy Roman Empire. It first referred to the Italian gold florin, introduced in the 13th century. It then referred to the Rhenish gulden (florenus Rheni) issued by several states of the Holy Roman Empire from the 14th century. The Rhenish gulden was issued by Trier, Cologne and Mainz in the 14th and 15th centuries. Basel minted its own Apfelgulden between 1429 and 1509. Bern and Solothurn followed in the 1480s, Fribourg in 1509 and Zürich in 1510, and other towns in the 17th century.

The Reichsmünzordnung or imperial minting ordinance of the Holy Roman Empire first defined standards for the Rhenish gulden (Rheinischer Gulden) in 1524. It also defined a silver Guldengroschen of equal value to the gulden.

The standards of the Rhenish gulden has changed over the centuries, as follows:

- In 1354, it was minted 1/66th a Cologne Mark of gold, 23 1/4 karats fine; hence 3.43 grams (0.110 troy ounces) fine gold, or identical to the Florentine florin.
- By 1419, it was minted 1/67th to a Mark, 19 karats fine; hence 2.76 grams (0.089 troy ounces) fine gold.
- By the 1559 Reichsmünzordnung, it was minted 1/72nd to a Mark, 18 1/2 karats; hence 2.50 grams (0.080 troy ounces) fine gold.

== Currency guilder ==
With increasingly standardized currencies in the early modern period, gulden or guilder became a term for various early modern and modern currencies, detached from actual gold coins. The Dutch guilder first emerged as the currency of the Burgundian Netherlands after the monetary reforms of 1435, under Philip the Good. It remained the national currency of the Netherlands until it was replaced by the euro, on 1 January 2002.

The Reichsmünzordnung of 1524 defined fixed standards for the gold Rhenish gulden and the Guldengroschen of equal value. By 1551, however, both coins were valued at 72 kreuzer, and a new guilder currency unit of 60 kreuzer was defined. The latter gulden was then defined over the succeeding centuries as a currency unit worth a fraction of the silver Reichsthaler.

In 1753, Austria-Hungary and Bavaria agreed to the Conventions monetary standard which resulted into two differently valued gulden: the Austro-Hungarian florin of the Austrian Empire from 1754 to 1892, and the South German gulden of the Southern German states from 1754, until German unification in 1871. Currencies identical to the South German gulden include the Bavarian gulden, Baden gulden & the Württemberg gulden.

A Danzig gulden was in use from 1923 to 1939.

== Currencies derived from the Dutch guilder ==
- The Netherlands Indies gulden was introduced in 1602, at the start of the United East Indies Company.
- The British Guianan guilder was in use in British Guiana from 1796 to 1839.
- The Netherlands Antillean guilder was in use in the Netherlands Antilles until its dissolution, in 2010. Afterwards, it remained the currency of the new countries Curaçao and Sint Maarten and (until 1 January 2011) the Caribbean Netherlands.
- The Surinamese guilder
- The Netherlands New Guinean gulden
- The Caribbean guilder is the currency of Curaçao and Sint Maarten.

== See also ==
Other coin names that are derived from the gold of which they were once made:

- Öre, øre
- Zloty
- Hungarian forint
- Meissen gulden
- Reichsguldiner
