= Konventionsfuß =

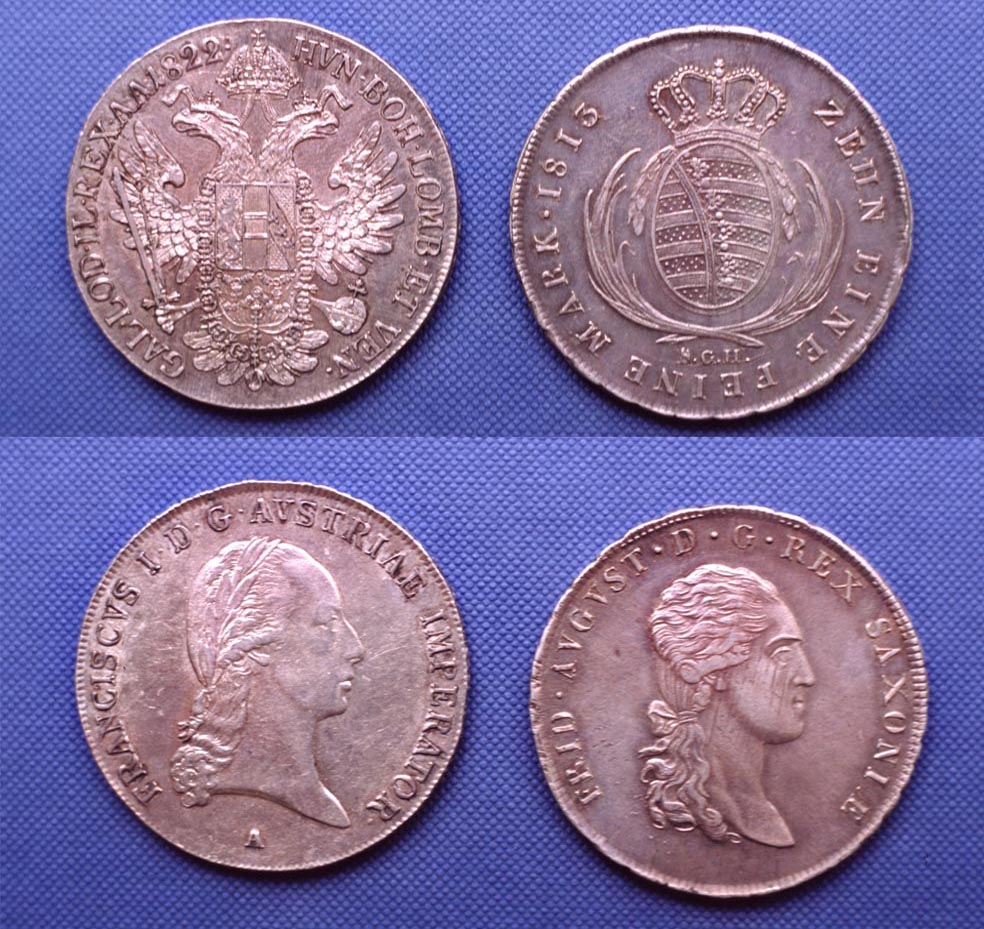
Konventionsthalers, Francis I, Emperor of Austria, 1822, Vienna Mint, and Frederick Augustus I, King of Saxony, 1813, Dresden Mint

A Konventionsfuß ("convention standard", lit.: "convention foot") was a coinage standard established by state treaty, the convention. The first one was between Austria and a number of German states of the Holy Roman Empire in the mid-18th century. This Convention determined that 20 gulden or 10 Speziesthaler (i.e. 1 Thaler = 2 Austrian gulden) be minted from a single Cologne mark of fine silver. Since the Cologne mark weighed approximately 233 g (with regional variants), one gulden had a fine weight of 11.69 g of silver.

The money minted to this standard was called the Convention thaler (Konventionsthaler) or Convention coin (Konventionsmünze). This designation was retained even after the states that had been party to the Convention, with the exception of Austria, had switched to a different standard.

== History ==
Austria had left the Leipzig standard (at 12 thalers or 18 gulden to a fine mark) in 1747 and from July 1748 had initially minted thalers to a standard of 19 gulden 3⅓ kreuzers but, on 7 November 1750, went over to a 20-gulden standard and called the new two-gulden piece, the thaler (Taler). To enlarge and secure its currency area, Austria concluded another treaty convention with Bavaria on 20 September 1753, which also introduced the 20-gulden standard to Bavaria; this has since been called the Convention standard (Konventionsfuß). Saxony and many other German imperial circles and estates also introduced the Convention standard. However, Bavaria withdrew from the treaty before the end of a year and switched to the 24-gulden standard.

The last south German Convention coin was minted in 1838. In Austria, the Convention standard expired in 1857 with the Vienna Minting Treaty, which saw the introduction of the Vereinsthaler of 1½ gulden).
