= Coin base weight =

Holy Roman Empire mathematical reference for the minting of coins

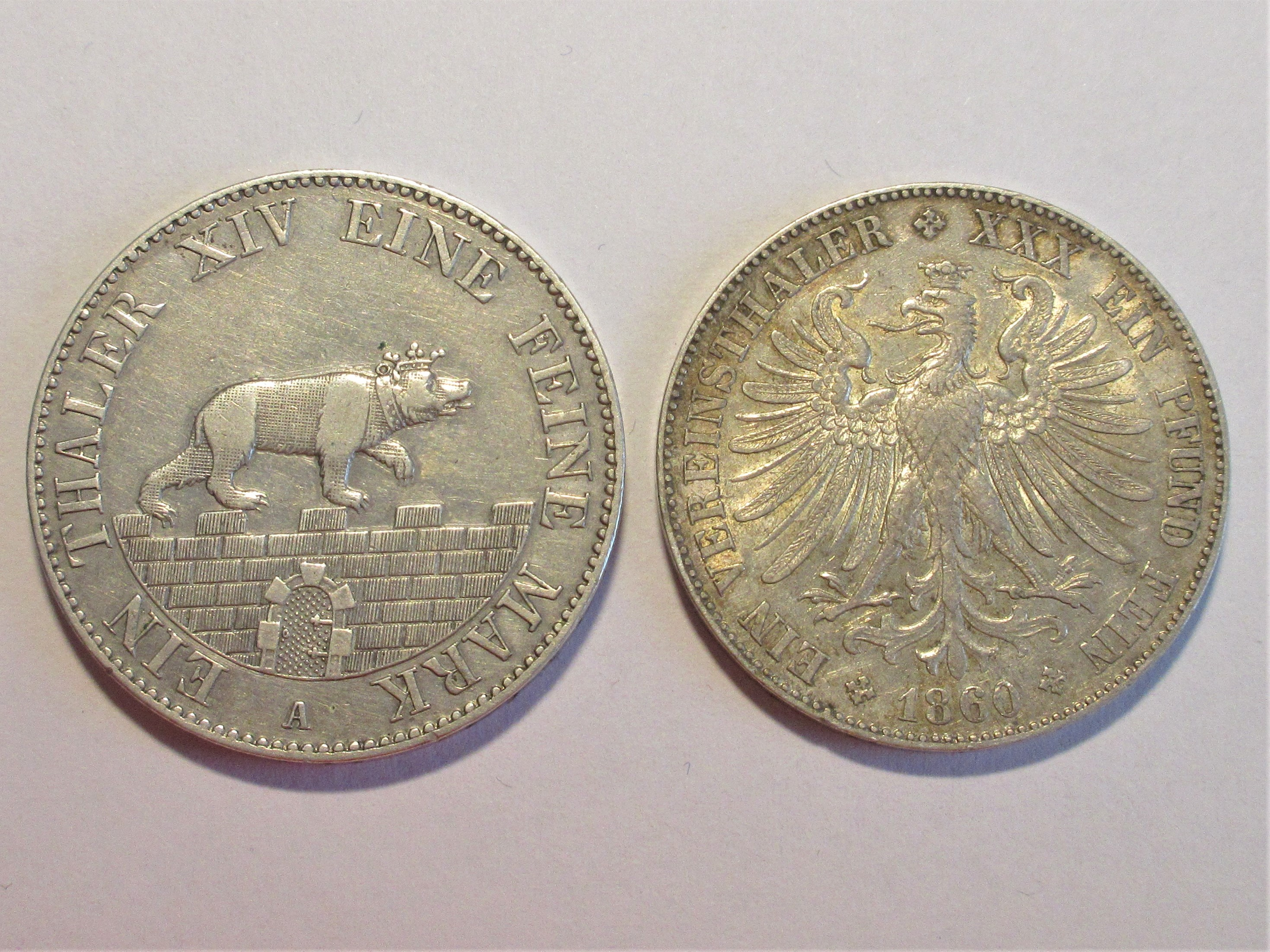
14 Thalers from a Cologne Mark and 30 Thalers from Zollpfund in the inscriptions

A coin base weight (Münzgrundgewicht) is a mathematical reference for the minting of coins that was used in the monetary systems of the Holy Roman Empire. In conjunction with the coin standard (Münzfuß), the coin base weight indicates how many coins are to be minted from a specified standard weight.

== Development ==
=== Carolingian Pound ===
The first coin base weight to be specified was the Carolingian Pound, a pound of pure silver weighing 407.92 g.

=== Cologne Mark ===
The Carolingian Pound was superseded by what became the most common coin base weight in Central Europe from the Middle Ages to the 19th century. This was the Cologne Mark of 233.779 grams of silver. Silver coins of different weights were minted from this standard weight. If Thalers were minted from the Cologne Mark to, say, a 10 Thaler standard (called Fuß i.e. "foot"), the Thaler contained approx. 23.4 grams of silver (10 Thalers from 234 grams). In the German states, at the beginning of 1834, Thalers were issued to several standards:

- 12 Thaler standard (19.5 grams of silver per Thaler)
- 13 1/2 Thaler standard (17.5 grams)
- 14 Thaler standard (16.7 grams)
- 18 1/2 Thaler standard (12.6 grams)
- 24, later 24 1/2 Gulden standard (9.5 grams of silver per Gulden)
- 34 Mark standard (6.9 grams of silver per Mark).

The weight shown was the fine silver content in each case. This meant that the total weight of these coins could be higher due to the addition, especially of copper. However, their currency value, which corresponded to their real value, only depended on the fine silver content, which resulted from the interplay between the coin base weight and the coin standard. The exact weight of the Cologne Mark could vary slightly from region to region. The Prussian specification of 233.855 grams became the binding coin base weight for the states participating in the Dresden Coinage Treaty. From this basic coin weight, Thalers and Gulden could only be minted to the 14 Thaler or 24 1/2 Gulden standards. The Prussian definition of the Cologne Mark corresponded exactly to half a Prussian pound in general weight terms.

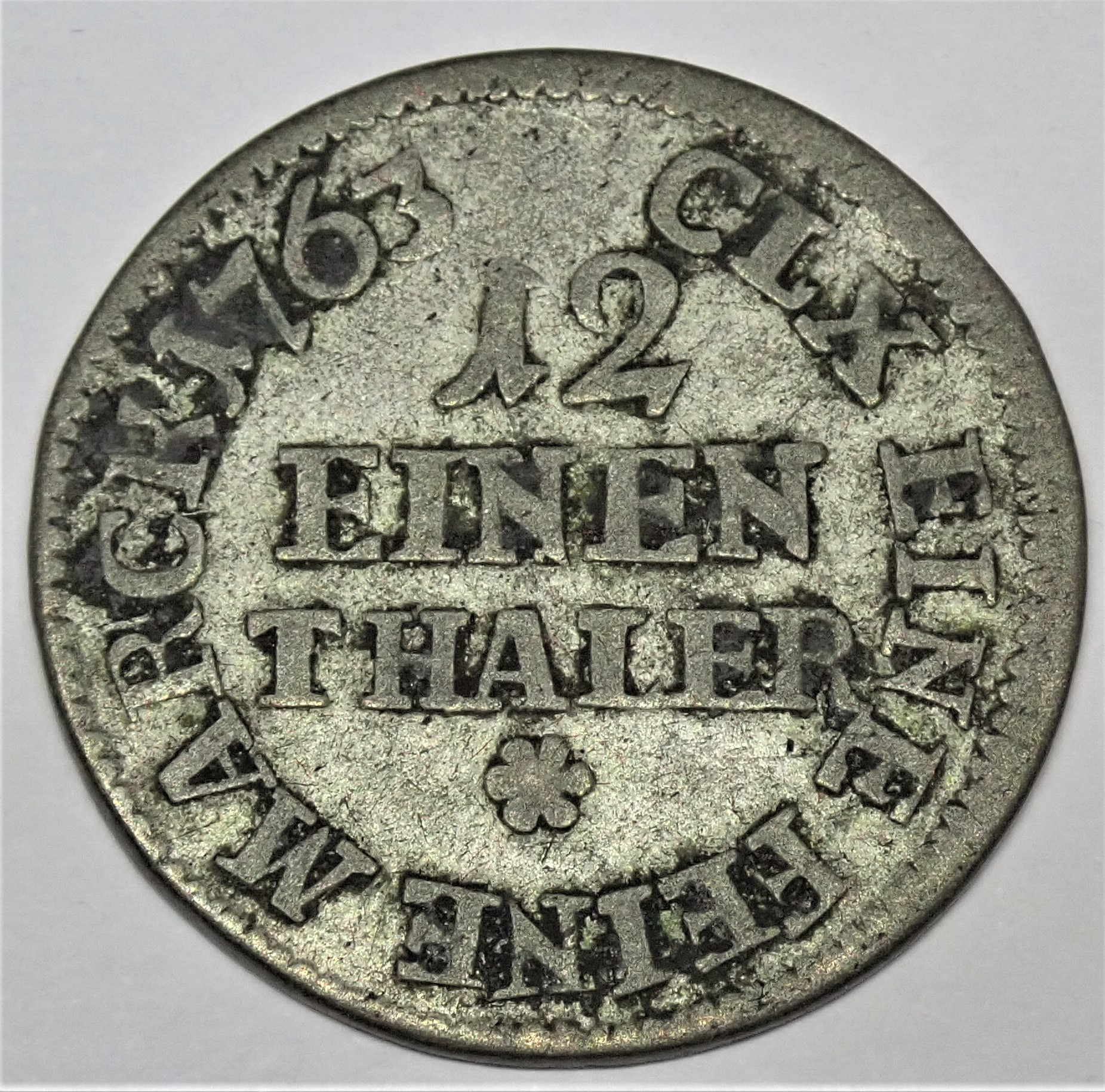
Saxon 1/12 Thaler, CLX a fine mark

Thaler subdivisions that were minted as currency coins, whose nominal value thus also corresponded to their silver value, could also state their relationship to the Cologne Mark in the inscription. The Saxon 1/12 Thaler of 1763 in the photograph is inscribed with CLX EINE FEINE MARCK; confirming that 160 of these coins corresponded to the total weight of the Cologne Mark.

=== Zollpfund ===
The Vienna Coinage Contract of 1857 was intended to further develop the coin base weight and standard of the coin in the direction of the decimal system. Instead of the Cologne Mark, the Zollpfund ("customs pound") of the German Customs Union (Zollverein) of 500 grams was now set as the coin base weight. Since the 14 Thaler standard was replaced by a 30 Thaler standard at the same time, the silver content of the Thaler did not change much. The fine silver weight of the Thaler fell from a theoretical 16.704 to 16.667 grams. This reduction in weight remained theoretical because the difference was within the manufacturing tolerances common at the time.

== Literature ==
- _ (1871). Politisches Handbuch: Staatslexikon für das deutsche Volk, Volume 2. Leipzig: Brockhaus.
- Arnold/Küthmann/Steinhilber: Großer deutscher Münzkatalog von 1800 bis heute. Battenberg Verlag, Regenstauf, pp. 7 and 9, 32nd edition, 2017, ISBN 978-3-86646-131-4
- Hauck, Dr. A.F. and Dr. H. Hauck (1875). Lehrbuch der Arithmetik für Gewerb-, Handels- und Realschulen., Volume 2, Part 1. Nuremberg: Friedr. Korn.
