= Fribourg frank =

The Frank was the currency of the Swiss canton of Fribourg between 1798 and 1850. It was subdivided into 10 Batzen, each of 4 Kreuzer or 10 Rappen. It was worth 1/4th the French silver écu or 6.67 g fine silver.

== History ==
The Frank was the currency of the Helvetian Republic from 1798, replacing the Gulden in Fribourg. The Helvetian Republic ceased issuing coins in 1803. Fribourg issued coins between 1806 and 1836. In 1850, the Swiss franc was introduced, with 1 Fribourg Frank = 1.4597 Swiss francs.

== Coins ==
Billon coins were issued in denominations of 2 1/2 and 5 Rappen, 1/2 and 1 Batzen, with silver coins for 5 and 10 Batzen and 4 Franken. The 2 1/2 Rappen was also denominated as 1 Kreuzer.
