= Matthiasgroschen =

North German coins (15th – 18th centuries)

The Matthiasgroschen, Matthier or Mattier is the name of various north German groschen coins of the 15th to 18th centuries.

During the course of the long-lasting period of debasement of the pfennig and the resulting emergence of larger denominations, a 1410 treaty was agreed between the town of Goslar and Bishop John III of Hildesheim to mint a common pfennig. This depicted on one side the coats of arms of the Prince-Bishopric of Hildesheim and County of Hoya, and, on the other side, Saint Matthew. One-sided pfennigs, or bracteates, were also issued with the image of the saint. From 1496, the actual Matthiasgroschen was minted by the town of Goslar, which bore the Goslar eagle on the obverse and St. Matthew with a sword and book on the reverse. Other states brought out numerous restrikes, which, however, were debased due to inferior alloying. Due to the widespread use of the Matthiasgroschen, their name lasted for a long time, even when they no longer bore the image of the saint, similar to the Mariengroschen.

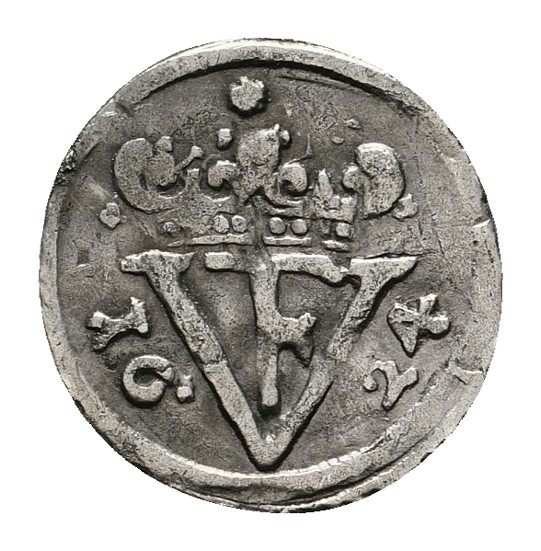
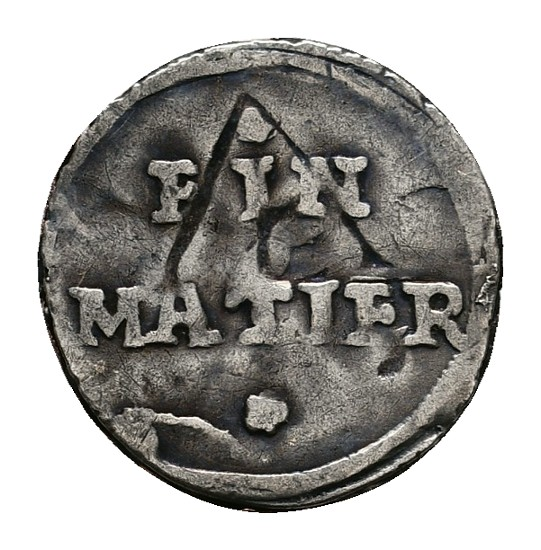
1 Mattier, Principality of Brunswick-Wolfenbüttel, Frederick Ulrich, 1624 (Welter 1139)

Mattier embossings from the years 1624 and 1629 under Frederick Ulrich of Brunswick-Wolfenbüttel no longer show the image of the saint, but only its denomination EIN MATIER.

Elector Frederick William of Brandenburg (1640–1688) had Mattiers struck for Ravensburg. In addition, in 1675 John Frederick of Calenberg had a Mattier minted worth 4 pfennigs with a monogram on the obverse and its value on the reverse.

The last time the name Mattier appeared was on copper denier coins, which were minted in 1758 during the Seven Years' War by the French occupation army in the Brunswick coins were minted. They were marked "1 DENIER" on one side and "13 ONE MATTIER" on the other.
