= Leipzig standard =

The Leipzig standard, sometimes called the Leipzig Mint standard, (German: Leipziger Fuß) was a standard of coinage or Münzfuß originally established by the Electorate of Brandenburg in 1687 for silver coins and known as the 12-Taler standard to replace the Zinna standard.

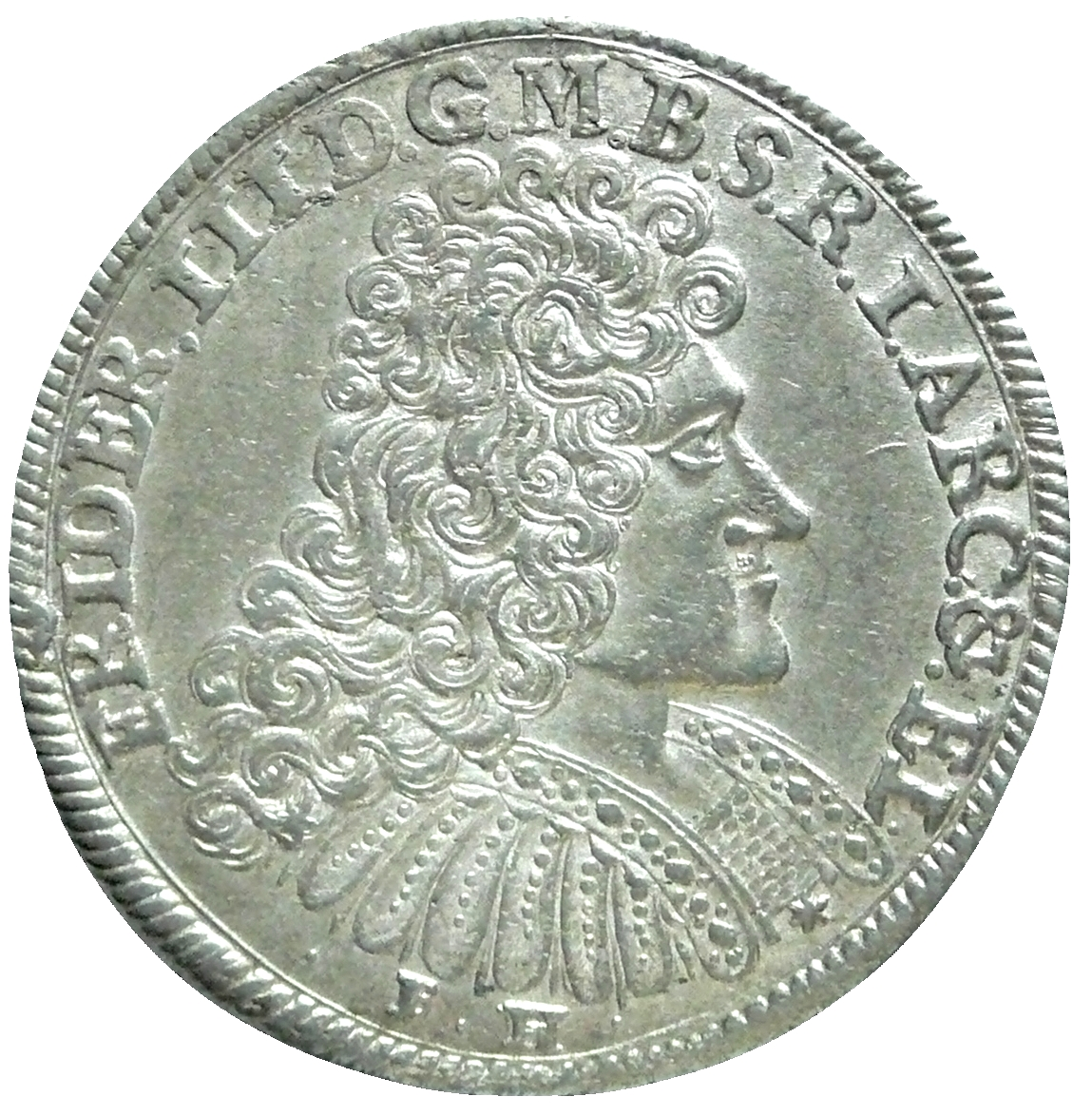
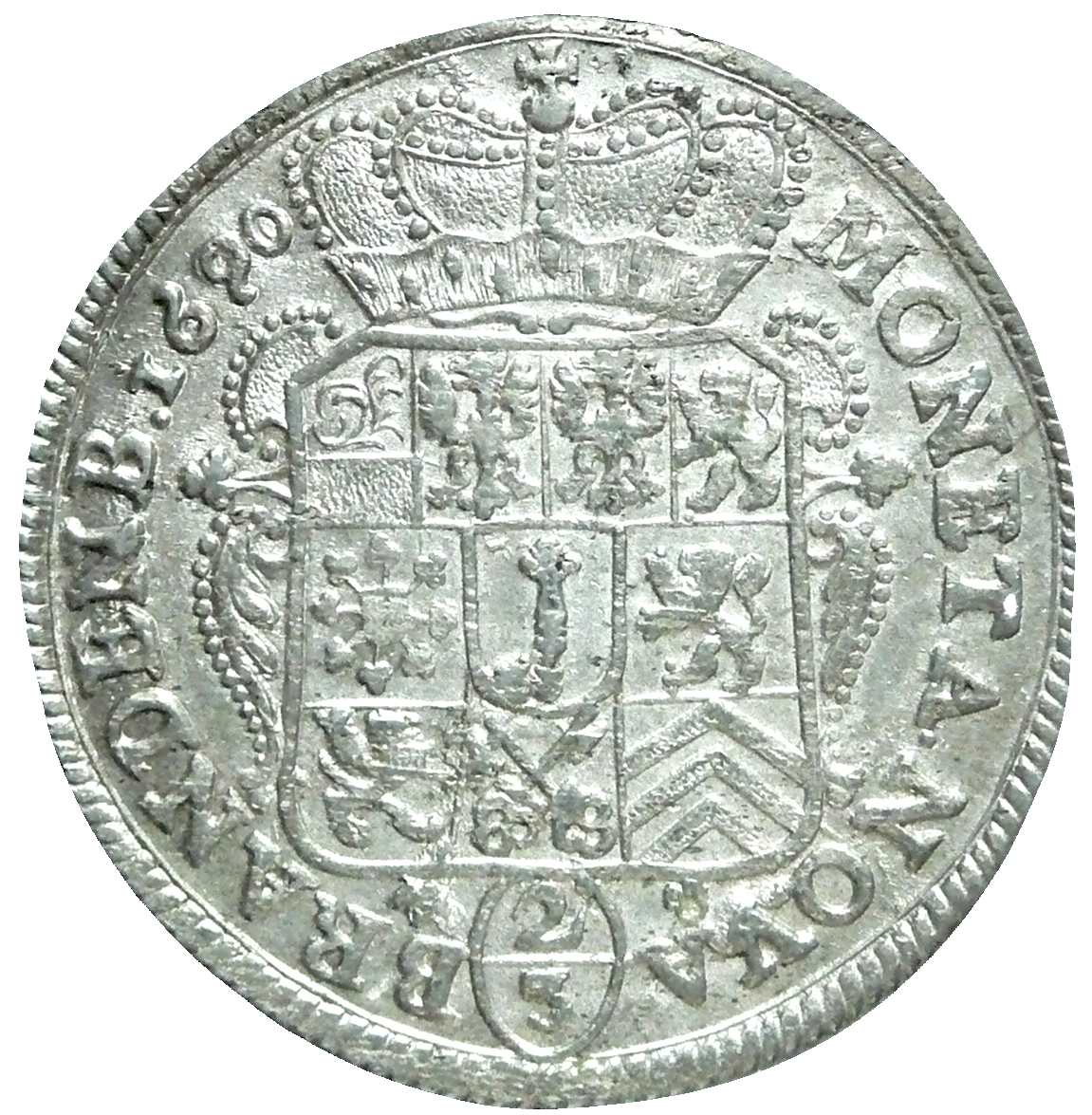
Frederick III. 2/3 thaler of 1690. Leipzig standard
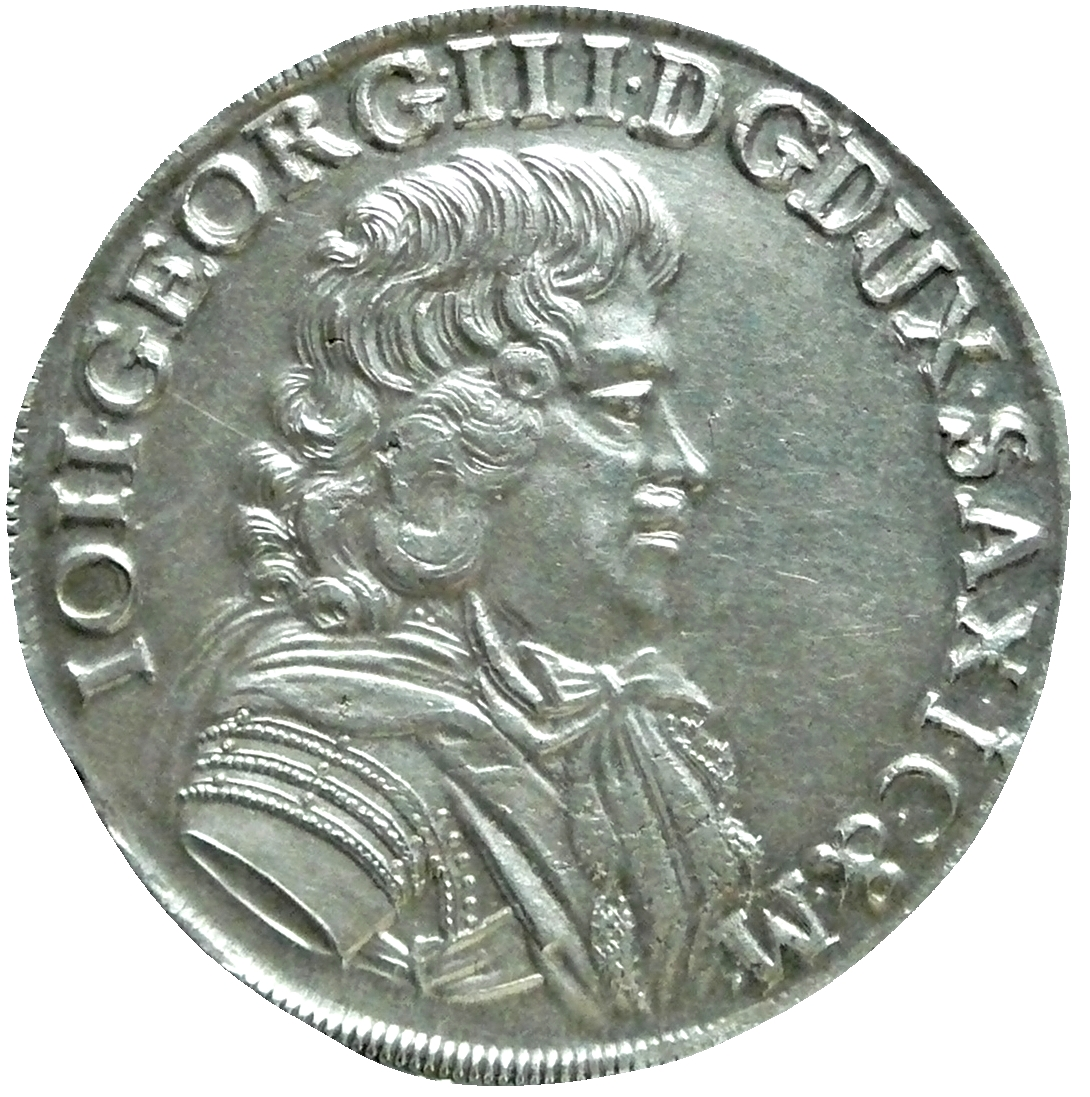
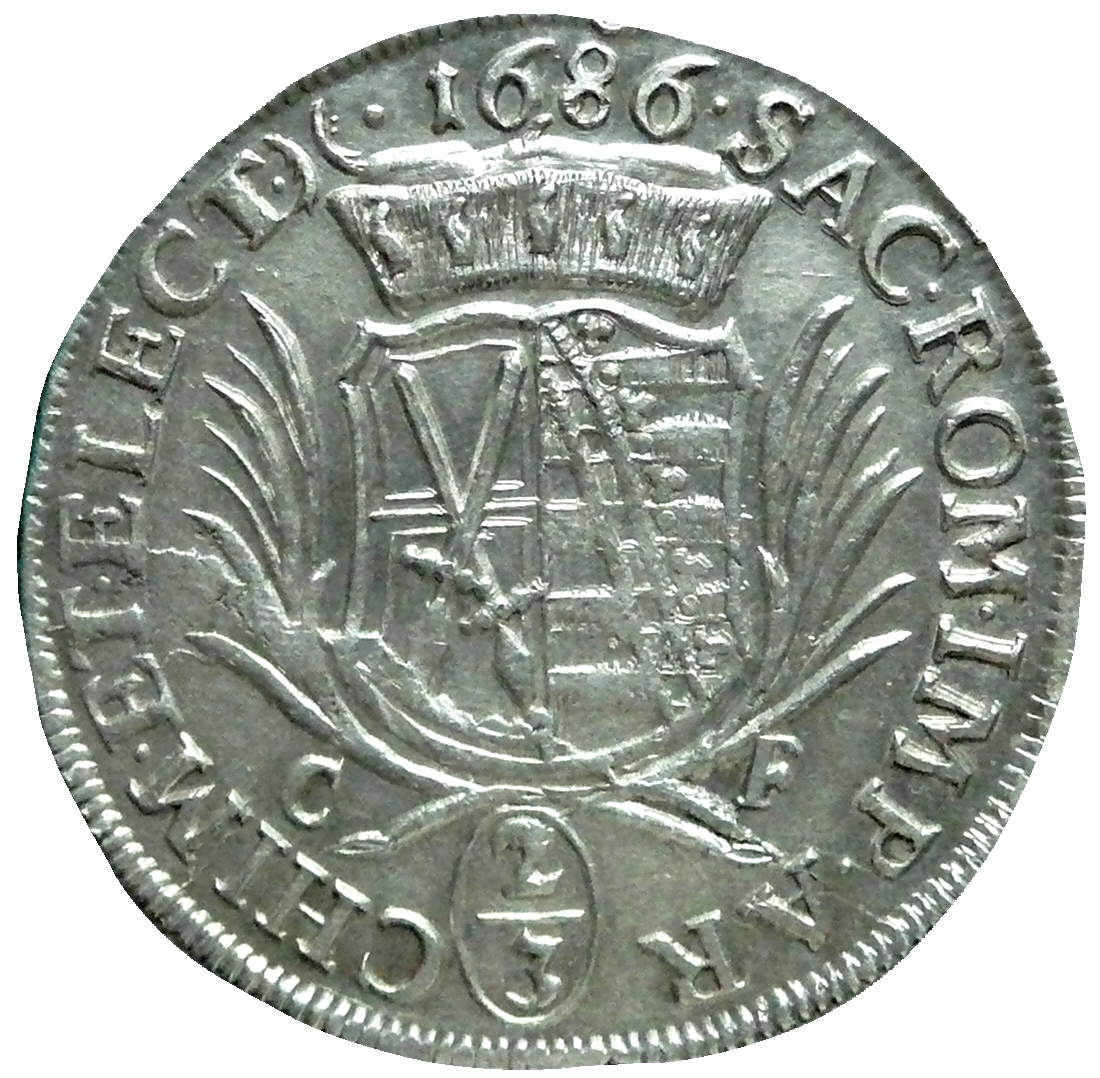
John George III 2/3 thaler of 1686. Zinna standard

== History ==
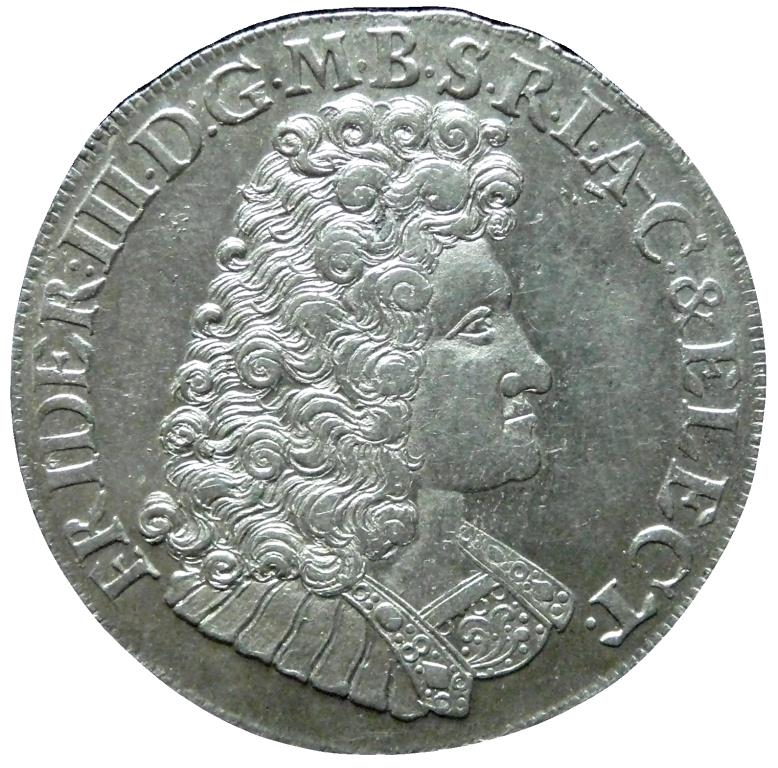
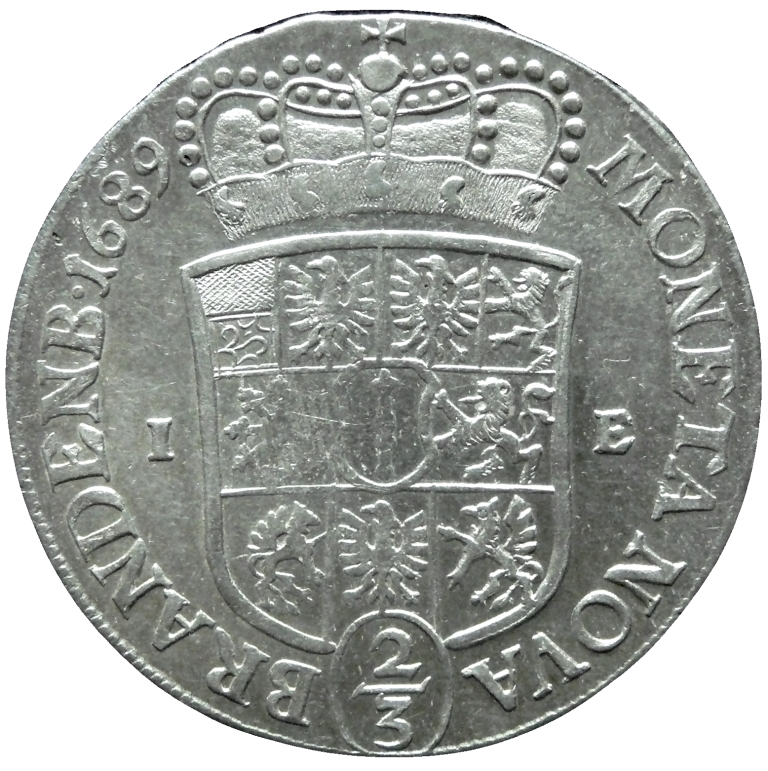
2/3 thaler of 1689. Frederick III. Magdeburg Mint. Minted as early as 1689–1690 to the 12-thaler standard

The minting of silver coins to a new standard in Electoral Brandenburg went back to the initiative of Dodo II of Innhausen and Knyphausen, who was in charge of coinage in Brandenburg from 24 September 1684. Due to the widespread increase in low-value coins, a change to the previous Zinna standard was essential. In 1686, however, their previous treaty partner, Electoral Saxony, refused to change the standard. After this, Dodo II had 2/3 and 1/3 thalers minted in Brandenburg to a 12-thaler standard starting in 1687. Elector John George III of Saxony and the Dukes of Brunswick-Lüneburg wanted to persuade the Brandenburg Elector, Frederick III, to return to the terms of the Treaty of Zinna. In 1689, the Brandenburg 2/3 thaler was devalued and even banned in Saxony.

Merchants at trade fairs in Leipzig and Brunswick accepted the new Brandenburg 2/3 thaler as the best money at the time. The protests of Leipzig merchants forced the Saxon elector to withdraw the ban that same year. From October 1689, the 2/3 thalerwas also minted to a 12-thaler standard in Electoral Saxony.

After writing to the Dukes of Brunswick-Lüneburg, they too were persuaded to accept the new standard. In this letter, Brandenburg threatened to close its mints because the price of silver had risen to at least 11 thalers, 8 groschen for a fine mark and a flood of inferior money had then set in along with the further spread of illegal mints (Heckenmünzstätten).

This forced agreement was reflected in the Leipzig Minting Treaty (Leipziger Münzvertrag) concluded on 16 January 1690 between Electoral Brandenburg, Electoral Saxony and Brunswick-Lüneburg.

== See also ==
- Coinage of Saxony#Zinna and Leipzig standards

== Literature ==
- Tate (1874). Tate's Modern Cambist. 16th edn. London: G.L.M. Strauss.
