= Mariengroschen =

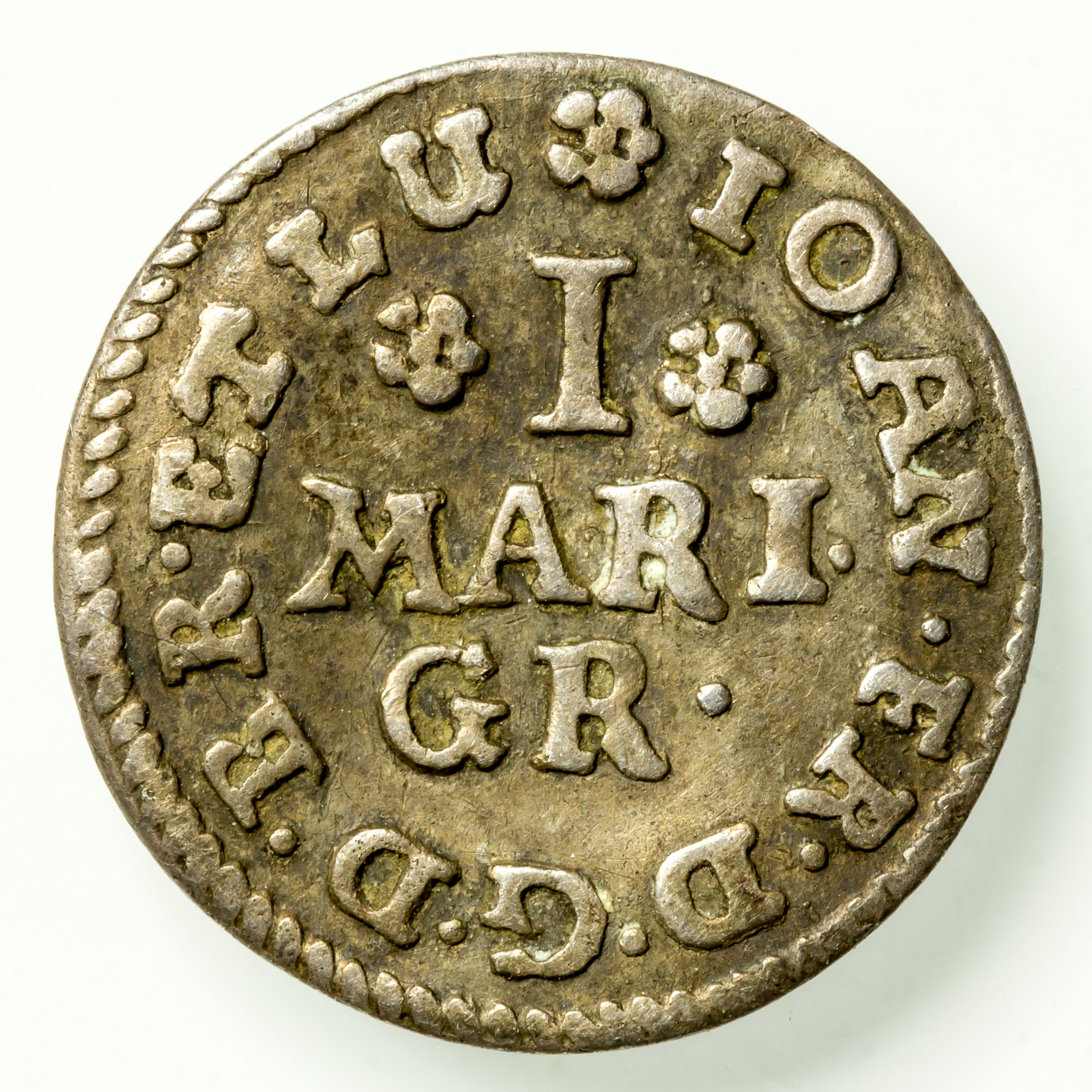
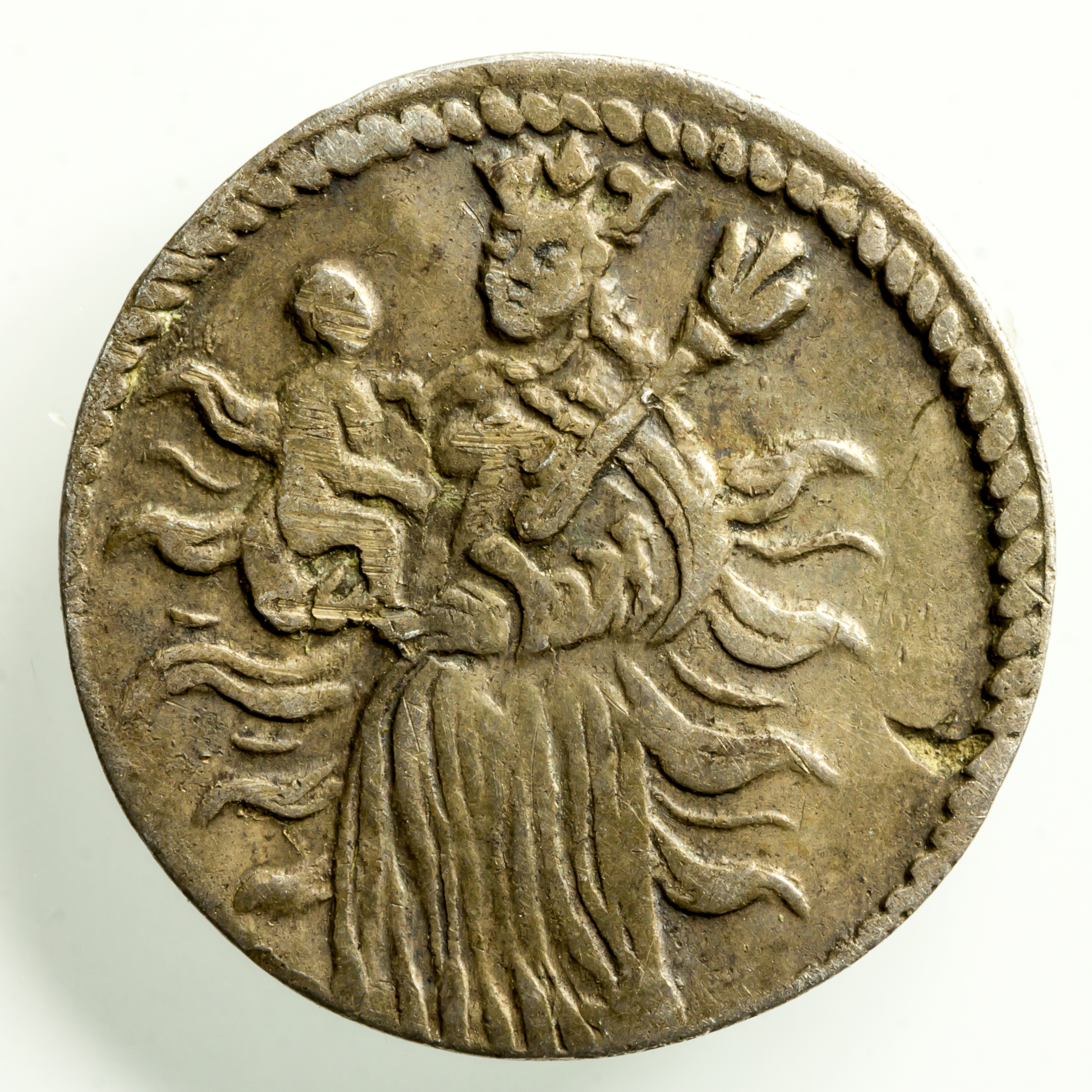
1 Mariengroschen, Principality of Calenberg, John Frederick, undated, (Welter 1812)
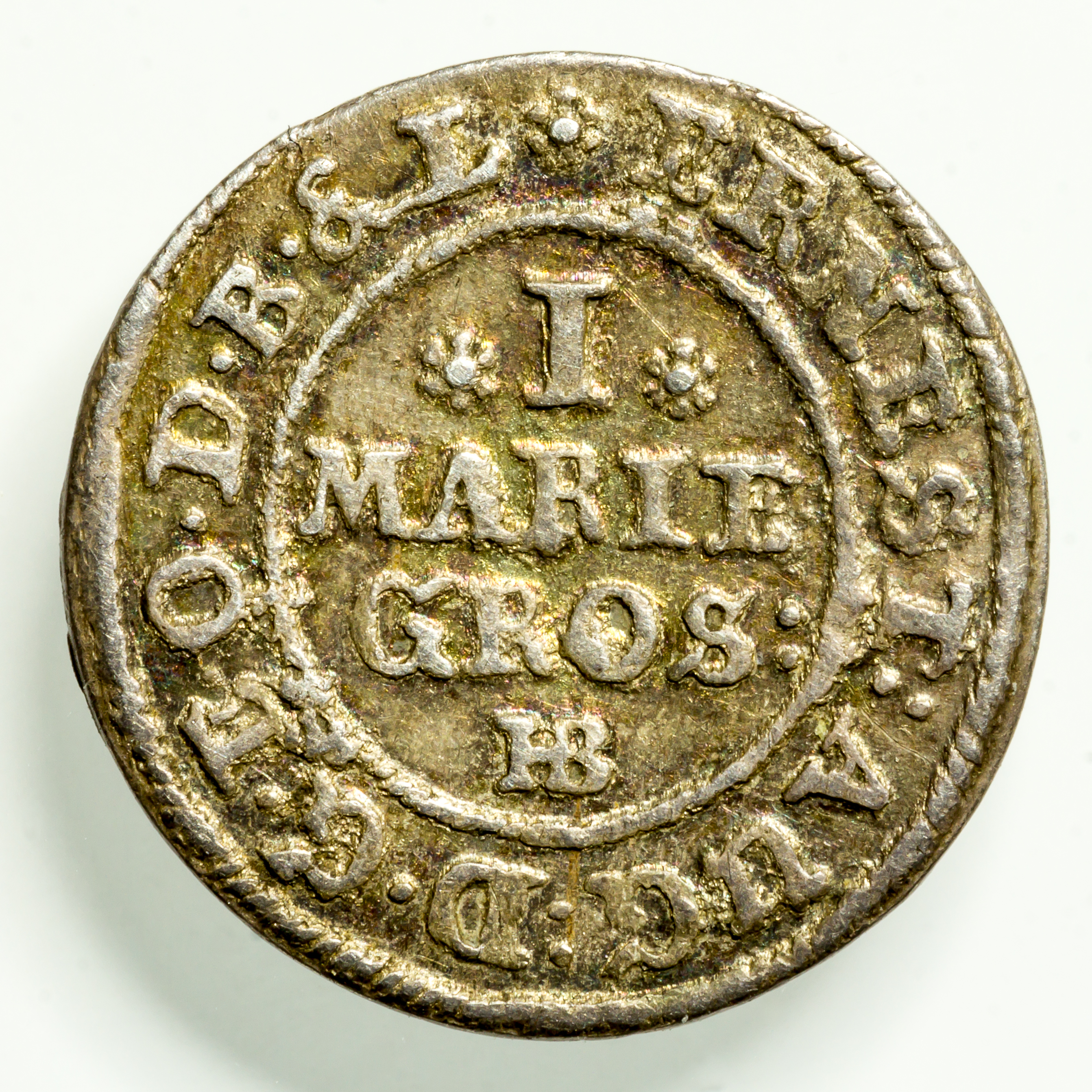
1 Mariengroschen, Principality of Calenberg, Ernest Augustus, 1683 (Welter 2027)

The Mariengroschen ("St. Mary's groschen") is an historical coin that was a type of groschen minted in Lower Saxony and Westphalia from the 16th to the 19th century. It was named after the Virgin Mary who was depicted on the reverse side.

Mariengroschen were first minted in Goslar in 1505 and then in other mints in the Harz mountain region, such as Brunswick and Hildesheim. The first coins were made of 8-lot silver; 80 being struck from 1 gross Cologne Mark. The fine weight decreased in the course of the 16th century; already around 1550 the fineness had been reduced to about half:

- Brunswick 1514: weight 2.75 g with 1.375 g silver content;
- Hildesheim 1528: weight 2.88 g with 1.062 silver content;
- Goslar 1551: weight 2.43 g with 0.91 g silver content;
- Brunswick 1572: weight 1.504 g with 0.69 g silver content.

The knightly estates of the Lower Saxon Circle, which were entrusted with coin supervision, followed this development. The Meissen Groschen gained influence through the debasement of the Mariengroschen.

== Late Mariengroschen ==
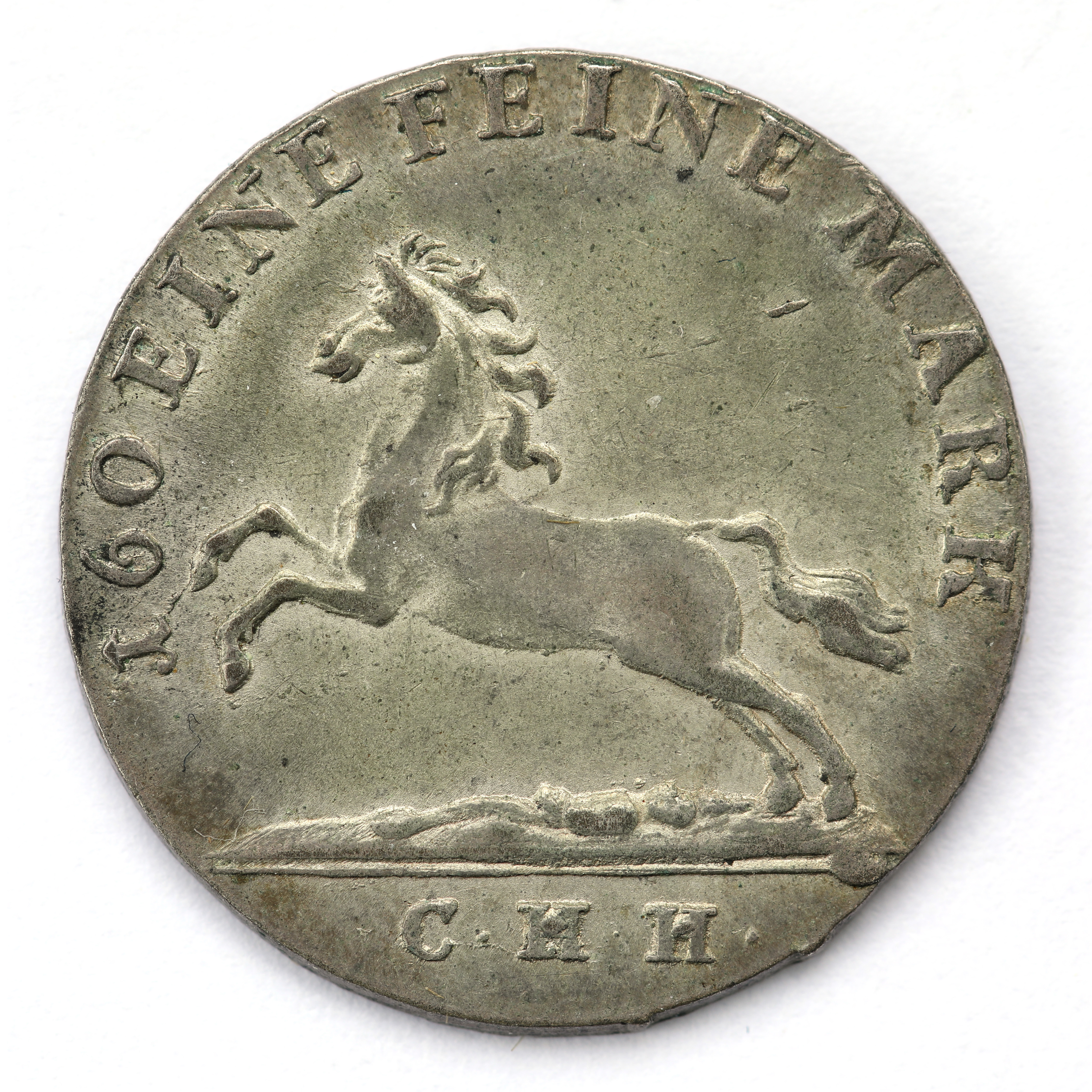
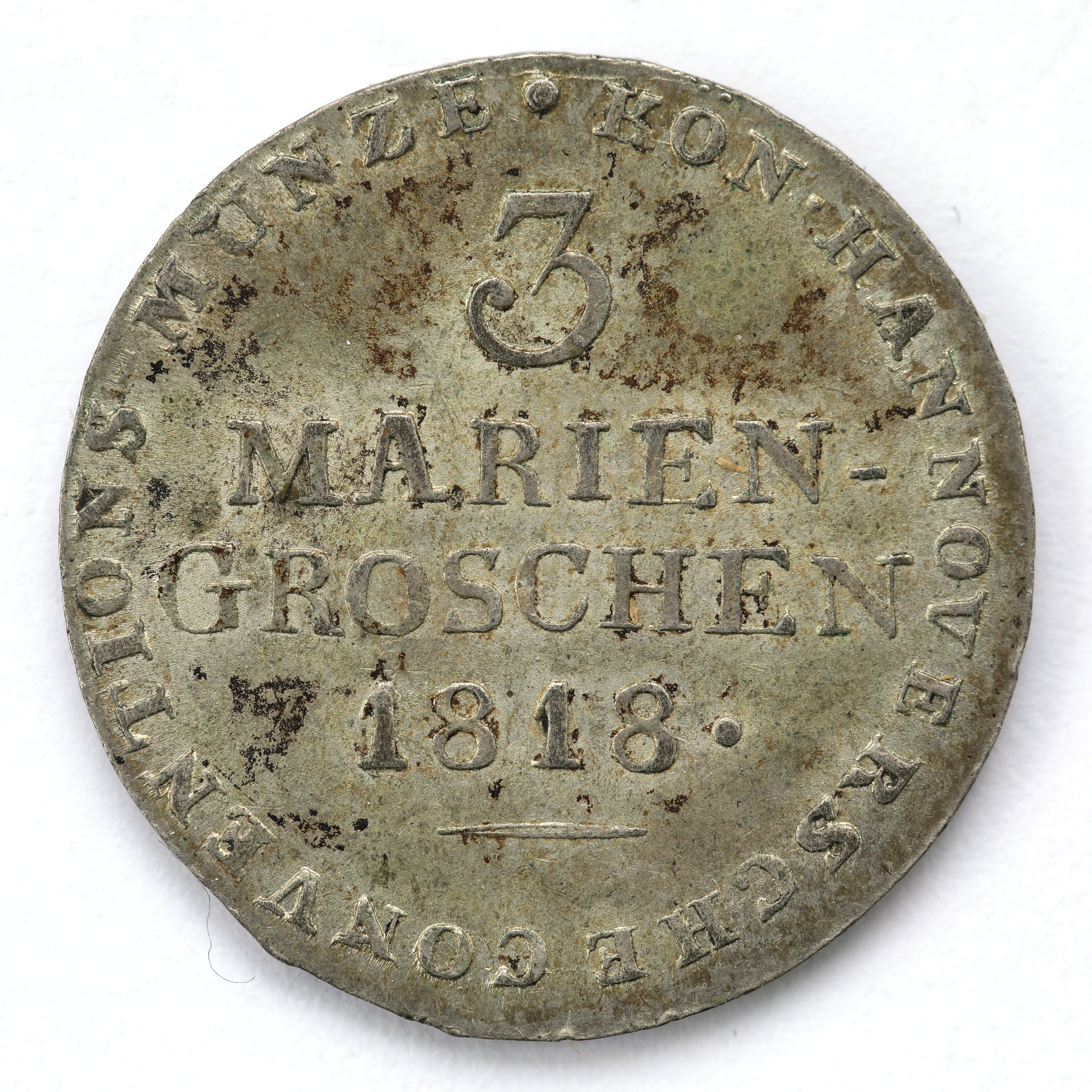
3 Mariengroschen Royal Hanoverian Convention coin, 1818 (Welter 2849)

In the Kingdom of Hanover Mariengroschen were last minted in 1816-1820 as Convention coins; the Duchy of Brunswick minted the Mariengroschen at five lots until 1834; Schaumburg-Lippe until 1821 with 1/4 fineness.
