= Fribourg gulden =

Swiss currency

The Fribourg Gulden was a currency denomination worth 14 Batzen of the Swiss canton of Fribourg until 1798.

Fribourg's basic currency unit was the livre (later franc or frank), divided into 10 batzen or 40 kreuzer. The French silver écu was equivalent to 4 francs or 40 batzen.

The écu was also equivalent to 4 Franken of the Helvetic Republic, and afterwards to 4 Fribourg frank. It was subdivided into 14 Batzen, each of 4 Kreuzer or 16 Denier. It was replaced by the Frank of the Helvetian Republic in 1798. This was, in turn, replaced by the Fribourg Frank.

== Coins ==
In the late 18th century, copper 1 Denier coins were issued, together with billon Vierer (2 Denier), 1 Kreuzer and 1/2 Batzen, and silver 7, 14, 28 and 56 Kreuzer. The silver denominations were equal to 1/8, 1/4, 1/2 and 1 Gulden.
