= Kipper und Wipper =

Financial crisis in 17th century

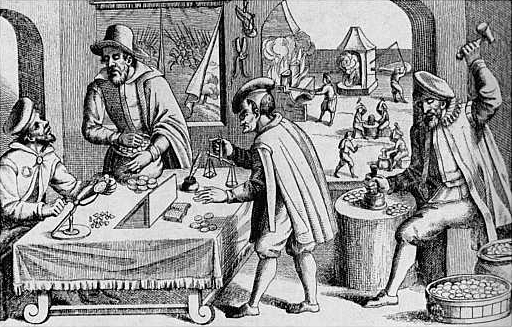
Clipping coins in a "Kipper mint"

Kipper und Wipper (German: Kipper- und Wipperzeit, literally "Kipper and Wipper time") was a financial crisis at the start of the Thirty Years' War. While debasement of coinage was observed earlier, with the onset of the war, military expenditures rose drastically and the city-states in the Holy Roman Empire began to heavily debase currency in order to raise revenue. The most severe debasing occurred around 1620–1623. After that time the authorities attempted to curb inflation and debased coins were declared illegal and withdrawn from circulation. The years 1620–1623 saw famine in the Kingdom of Germany, often attributed to Kipper und Wipper, among other causes.

The name refers to the use of balance scales (Wippen) which quickly tilted (kippen) on good coins. In practice, the balance functioned as a quick threshold test, separating full-weight coins from lighter ones without requiring the exact weight of each coin to be measured.

== History ==
The not-yet-debased coins were then taken out of circulation, melted, mixed with baser metals such as lead, copper or tin, and re-issued. Often the states did not debase their own currency, but instead manufactured low-value imitations of coins from other territories and then spent them in yet other territories as far as possible from their own lands, hoping that the resulting damage would then occur to the economy of those other regions rather than their own. Weighing and sorting formed the core of the operation: heavier coins were set aside for melting, while lighter or debased money went back into circulation. The names Kipper and Wipper referred both to the instruments themselves and to the disreputable trade in debased money.

This worked for a while; but after a time, the general public caught on to the manipulation, resulting in pamphlets denouncing the practice, local riots and the refusal of soldiers and mercenaries to fight unless paid in real, non-debased money. Also, the states began to get back their own debased coins in taxes and customs fees. Because heavier coins were consistently pulled out while inferior ones were put back into circulation, weight-based sorting steadily drained full-value money from everyday exchange. Due to these problems the practice largely stopped around 1623; however, the damage done was so large that it created financial disarray in almost all the city-states in the area. The same thing recurred on a smaller scale near the end of the century and again during the middle of the 18th century; however, the debasement spread from Germany to Austria, Hungary, Bohemia, and Poland.

During Kipper und Wipper, there were two forms of debasement. To finance the Thirty Years' War, which was occurring simultaneously, coins were either shaved down or melted. By clipping or shaving coins, the amount of silver or precious metal in the coin decreased. Additionally, by melting coins, mixing them with lesser metals, making new coins, and circulating them, the nominal value, or face value, diverged further from the melt value or value of the metal in the coin. A standard weight could expose coins made underweight by clipping and wear, but it could not establish the fineness of an alloyed coin whose total weight was still correct.

A major decision made by cities that resulted in the creation of more mints and eventually more debased coinage came when six cities decided to allow the establishment of more mints, places to manufacture coins and money. By doing so, mints were able to mint more debased coins.

Many states in Europe tried to finance their war efforts through debased coins. Charles P. Kindleberger wrote, "Bad money was taken by debasing states to their neighbors and exchanged for good." Referring to good money, he said that states would mint debased coins, exchange them in a neighboring state, and bring good coins back. This brought in coins that had a higher content of silver. However, the neighboring states also debased their coins to prevent a loss of money. This resulted in hyperinflation, the rapid increase of prices in a short period of time, which eventually became a crisis throughout many states in Europe as debased coins spread rapidly from state to state.

The years 1620–1623 saw famine in the Kingdom of Germany, often attributed to Kipper und Wipper among other causes.

During the period of crisis, many methods were thought of to prevent the debasement of coins and to prevent Gresham's law, which states that coins with a lower melt value or intrinsic value circulate faster and better than coins that have a higher melt value. This kind of testing worked best as a first pass: underweight coins could be rejected on the spot, while coins of doubtful fineness still needed closer examination.

In Europe, the import of bad coins and the export of good coins were punished by measures such as banishment, burning, or the confiscation of goods.

== Price history ==
The following table shows the exchange rate trend between the full-value Reichsthaler and the debased Kreuzer:

Year	Reichstaler–Kreuzer Exchange Rate
1566	68
1590	70
1600	72
1610	84
1617	90
1619	124
1620	140
1621	<390
1622	>600 regional >1000
1623	90

The development of the number of groschen payable in the Weimar region for a Reichstaler struck according to the Imperial Coinage Standard, covering the period from 1609 to 1623, is presented in the article Münzstätte Neustadt an der Orla.
