= Treaty of Zinna =

1667 treaty between Brandenburg and Saxony

The Zinna Coin Treaty of 1667 for the standardisation of coinage was signed at Zinna Abbey, approx. 50 km south of Berlin, between Electoral Brandenburg and Electoral Saxony. The treaty defines the 10½ thaler standard (10½-Taler-Fuß standard, Zinna Münzfuß).

The two states agreed to keep the 9-thaler standard of the Imperial Minting Ordinance of 1559/66 for the thaler, but to mint the Scheidemünzen more easily, namely to the 10½-taler standard.

When the Duchy of Brunswick-Lüneburg joined the treaty in 1668, it was also agreed that the 10½ thaler standard would also apply to the 2/3, 1/3 and 1/6 thaler coins.

== See also ==
- Valuation of the species Reichstaler in Zinna currency and the value of the Kuranttaler
- Saxon coin history/Minting after the Treaty of Zinna in 1667

== Literature ==
- Wolfgang Trapp (1999). Kleines Handbuch der Münzkunde und des Geldwesens in Deutschland. Stuttgart: Reclam-Verlag, ISBN 3-15-018026-0.
