= Lot (fineness) =

Unit of measurement

- Unit system: German imperial
- Unit of: number (quotient or fraction)
- Symbol: $\mathrm{ Lot }$

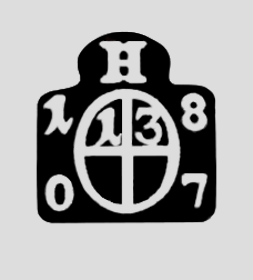
Austro-Hungarian lot hallmark for 13 lot silver (year 1807)

A Lot (formerly Loth) was an old unit of measurement for the relative fineness to gross weight in metallurgy and especially in coinage until the 19th century. A Lot was thus a proportion of the precious metal content in a piece of metal. It was used in the four main monetary systems of Germany: Austrian, South German, North German and Hamburg.

The lot was defined as the sixteenth part of a Mark. For example, in silver, the total weight was divided into 16 (proportional) Lots until about 1857, according to which a "12-Lot" silver alloy (750 silver) contained 12/16 = 3/4 or 75% by weight of silver and 25% of another metal (usually copper). A 14-Lot silver alloy (14/16), on the other hand, corresponded to 875 silver. For refinement, a Lot was further divided into 18 grains. Thus 14 Lots, 4 grains fine then correspond to a fineness of 888.89 ‰ = (14 + 4 / 18) / 16 = (252 + 4)/288, i.e. 256/288 grains.

The German proportional measure, the Lot, was finally replaced on 1 January 1888 in the German Empire by the proportional measure, permille (thousandths).

== See also ==
- Carat for gold.
