= Reichsthaler =

Formerly used coinage

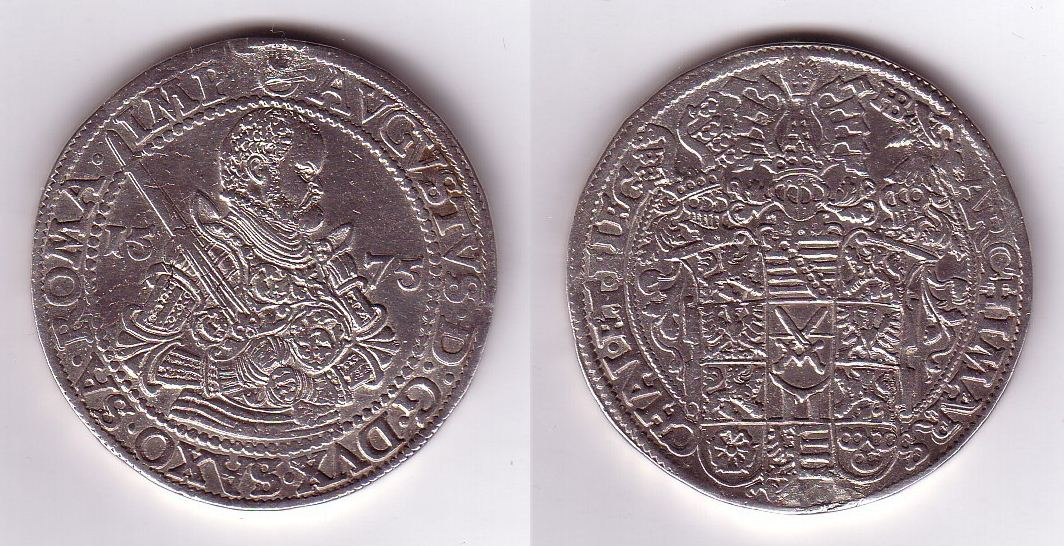
Electorate of Saxony, Reichstaler from 1575 from the Dresden mint, Mmz. HB

The Reichsthaler (German: [ˈʁaɪçsˌtaːlɐ]; modern spelling Reichstaler), or more specifically the Reichsthaler specie, was a standard thaler silver coin introduced by the Holy Roman Empire in 1566 for use in all German states, minted in various versions for the next 300 years, and containing 25–26 grams fine silver.

Reichsthaler was also the name of a currency unit worth less than the Reichsthaler specie introduced by several North German states from the 17th century; discussed separately under North German thaler.

Several old books confusingly use the same term Reichsthaler for the specie silver coin as well as the currency unit. This is disambiguated by referring to the full-valued coin as the Reichsthaler specie and the lower-valued currency unit as the Reichsthaler currency (courant, kurant).

== History ==
The Reichsthaler – literally, the dollar of the realm – was the most successful standard silver coin resulting from the 1524–1559 Reichsmünzordnungen or 'imperial minting ordinances' defining a uniform currency standard for the states of the Holy Roman Empire. Below is a history (in terms of grams of silver) of the Reichsthaler specie and its predecessor, the Guldengroschen; as well as the Gulden currency unit used before 1618. The history of the lower-valued thaler currency unit is continued under North German thaler.

Value of Reichsthaler / Guldengroschen & Gulden in grams silver
Coin	Reichsthaler g	Gulden g
1486-1524 Guldengroschens	≈30	
1524 Guldengroschen, ideal	27.405	27.405
1555 Guldengroschen of 1.2G	27.405	22.837
1566 Reichsthaler Specie of 1.2G	25.984	21.653
1615 Reichsthaler Specie of 1.5G	25.984	17.323

=== Prior to the Guldengroschen ===
Since the Holy Roman Empire was a loose federation of hundreds of feudal and princely rulers, Germany had a collection of currency systems loosely related to the Frankish Carolingian monetary system with one pound (later Gulden) equal to 20 shillings (later Groschen), and a shilling equal to 12 pennies (Pfennig). Many feudal rulers claimed the right to issue their own currency in their own domains, and often debased them in moments of stringency. Developments in the French livre currency system influenced the evolution of the German currencies. The French denier led to the pfennig in the 9th century. France's 1-shilling Gros tournois then became the groschen in the 13th century. Finally, the ounce-sized French livre & Dutch guilder of the 15th century helped define Germany's ounce-sized Guldengroschen and its subdivisions.

=== The Guldengroschen, 1486–1524 ===
The Guldengroschen was a large silver coin of approximately 30 grams minted from the mine output of nations located southeast of modern-day Germany. The coin's name denotes its approximate equivalence to the Dutch guilder and French livre parisis of the 15th century, then worth around 1 ounce of silver or 2.6 grams gold. Though initially of varying weights and even facing competition from the Joachimsthaler, it was a coin that succeeded in the era of abundant precious metals in the 16th century, and was a natural choice of unit for a unified German currency.

=== Reichsmünzordnung, 1524–1566 ===
The Reichsmünzordnung were a series of minting ordinances of the Holy Roman Empire defining the monetary system that would unify the numerous disparate currencies of its member states. The ordinance of 1524 defined two coins of equal value to the Reichsgulden currency.

- The silver guldengroschen, 8 minted from an eight-ounce Cologne Mark (233.856 g) of silver (hence, 1 ounce or 29.232 g per coin) of fineness 15/16 – hence 27.405 g fine silver
- The gold gulden or florin, which in its final form had a tale of 72 to a Cologne Mark, 18 1/2 karats fine - hence 2.5036 g fine gold.
- Both coins were equal to the Reichsgulden, divided into 60 kreuzer, 21 groschen or 21x12=252 pfennig.

This remained an ideal or unimplemented system until the following changes were made in 1555:

- The silver guldengroschen & the gold gulden were raised in value to 1.2 Gulden, 24 groschen, 72 kreuzer or 24x12 = 288 pfennig.
- The Gulden therefore became an (uncoined) accounting or currency unit worth 60 kreuzer or 60x4 = 240 pfennig
- and containing 27.405/1.2 = 22.84 g fine silver or 2.5032/1.2 = 2.086 g fine gold.

=== Reichsthaler introduction, 1566 ===
The Reichsthaler turned out to be the most successful coin resulting from the 16th century Reichsmünzordnungs. It was borne out of an ordinance in 1559 discontinuing the 72-kreuzer guldengroschen and proposing in its place a smaller 60-kreuzer gulden coin. Popular demand for a replacement to the ounce-sized coin resulted in the Reichsthaler, 1 ounce silver of 8/9 fineness (hence, 9 to a Cologne Mark or 25.984 g fine), and fixed at 68 kreuzer.

The new coin was popularly accepted but at a higher value of 72 kreuzer or 1.2 Gulden. It consequently doomed the (now-overvalued) gulden coin. Reichsthalers prevailed as circulating coin, and the gulden again became an uncoined currency unit equivalent to 25.984/1.2 = 21.653 g fine silver.

This Reichsthaler specie or coin would continue to be divided into 24 groschen but would rise in value vs currency at 1.5 Gulden or 90 kreuzer by 1615. The Dutch adopted it as the rijksdaalder with 25.40 g fine silver and valued at 2.5 Dutch guilders as of 1618.

=== Kipper und Wipper Crisis, 1618 ===
The Thirty Years' War 1618-48 and the Kipper und Wipper financial crisis of 1618-23 led to widespread currency debasements of up to 10 gulden to a Reichsthaler specie. It destroyed the financial system created during the Reichsmünzordnung era as well as Empire's centralized authority over the states.

After 1630 the different North German states reconstructed their currency systems with a Thaler worth 24 gutegroschen or 1 1/2 gulden, but little is on record with regard to the mint systems until after 1667. They were thus on a de facto thaler currency unit with some uncertainty in its value versus the Reichsthaler specie. A currency trial done in 1665 indicated a lower prevailing (and unofficial) rate of 14 1/4 gulden or 9 1/2 thaler to a Cologne Mark.

=== The North German thaler currency unit after 1667 ===
The Zinnaische currency standard of 1667 was the first to define the North German thaler, de jure, as a currency unit worth less than the Reichsthaler specie. The succeeding Leipzig standard of 1690 then became the prevailing thaler and gulden currencies throughout the Holy Roman Empire. A summary of the thaler standards, in brief:

- The 1667 Zinnaische thaler was issued at 10 1/2 to a Cologne Mark of fine silver.
- The widely adopted Leipzig thaler of 1690 was issued at 3/4th a Reichsthaler specie, or 12 to a Mark, or 19.488 fine silver.
- From the 1730s the German states unofficially slipped to a gold standard after the gold-silver ratio dropped to 14.5, as states rushed to reissue their currencies in cheaper gold. From 1741 the Friedrich d'or pistole of approx. 6.0 g fine gold was valued at 5 thalers, making each thaler worth about 1.2 g gold or 1.2 x14.5 = 17.4 g silver.
- From 1754 many North German states implemented the Austrian Conventions standard with the thaler issued at 3/4 a Conventionsthaler, or 13 1/3 to a Mark, or 17.5392 g fine silver.
- From 1840 many North German states adopted the Prussian thaler standard of 14 to a Mark, or 16.704 g fine silver. This standard was slightly modified in 1857 as the Vereinsthaler of 16 2/3 g fine silver.

All North German thalers and Vereinsthalers were retired after 1873 in favor of the German gold mark, with each mark containing 100/279 gram of fine gold, at the rate of 1 thaler = 3 marks, or a gold ratio of 15.5.

== The Reichsthaler in other currency systems ==
Dutch Rijksdaalder, 1622

The Reichsthaler specie was widely issued in Germany for 200 years but was discontinued in many states after 1754 in favor of the lighter Conventionsthaler of 1/10th a Cologne Mark or 23.3856 g fine silver. However it survived both as coin and bank money in several Northern European states until they adopted the gold standard in 1875.

In 1583 the Dutch rijksdaalder coin of 25.40 g fine silver was the counterpart of the reichsthaler in the Dutch Republic. From 1608 to 1659 it then functioned as bank money of the Bank of Amsterdam (Amsterdam Wisselbank), worth 2.5 gulden banco and representing 25.40 g fine silver actually received. From 1659 to 1800 the bank money was redefined as the Silver Dukat of 24.36 g fine silver worth 2.4 gulden banco, which was also subsequently named (confusingly) as the rijksdaalder.

In 1618 the full-weight Reichsthaler Specie coin of 25.984 g fine silver was the bank money of the Hamburger Bank worth 3 Hamburg mark banco. Its weight was redefined after 1770 at 9 1/4 to a Cologne Mark of fine silver, or 25.28 g, and it was continued to be used until German reunification in 1871.

The Rigsdaler served as the currency in Denmark and Norway until 1875, with the higher-valued Rigsdaler Specie (25.28 g fine silver) also coexisting with lower-valued Rigsdaler currency or courant; see Danish rigsdaler & Norwegian rigsdaler. In Sweden, the Riksdaler Specie of 25.50 g fine silver also coexisted with other riksdaler in copper or lower-valued currency; see Swedish riksdaler.
