= Guldengroschen =

15th–16th century silver coin

Guldengroschen
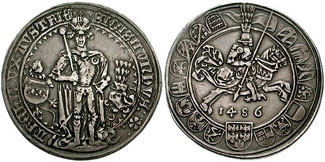
First side of the image: O •SIGISMVNDVS: *: ARCHIDVX• AVSTRIE•, Sigismund standing in armor, wearing crown and holding orb; shield to left, crested helmet to right
Second side of the image: R Armored knight on horseback right, carrying banner; arms of Austrian provinces around.
Sigismund, Archduke of Austria. 1427-1496.

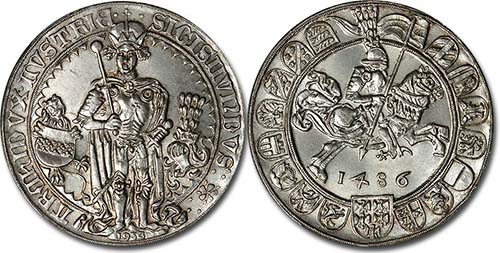
An official restrike of the 1486 Tiroler Guldengroschen

The Guldengroschen or Guldiner was a large silver coin originally minted in Tirol in 1486, but which was introduced into the Duchy of Saxony in 1500.

The name "Guldengroschen" came from the fact that it has an equivalent denomination value in silver relative to that of the goldgulden (60 kreuzer). In the latter years of the 1470s and early years of the 1480s Sigismund of Austria issued decrees that reformed the poor state of his region's coinage by improving the silver fineness back to a level not seen in centuries (.937 pure) and created denominations larger than the ubiquitous, but fairly low valued Groschen of 4 to 6 Kreuzer that were in use.

In 1484, small numbers of "half guldengroschens" valued at 30 kreuzer were issued. This was a revolutionary leap in denomination from the smaller pieces, and surpassed even the large testones of Italy which were the highest weight coins in use. Finally, in 1486 the full sized guldengroschen of 60 kreuzers was put into circulation and it was soon nicknamed "Guldiner". For a long time thereafter such coins were also called "unciales" because their actual silver weight was very nearly one ounce. As large quantities of silver became available other states began issuing guldiners of their own. Bern, in modern-day Switzerland was one of the earliest to follow the County of Tyrol by issuing its guldiners in 1493. In 1500, Saxony's mint at Annaberg took minting of guldiners to new heights and the economies of central Europe welcomed these large new coins.

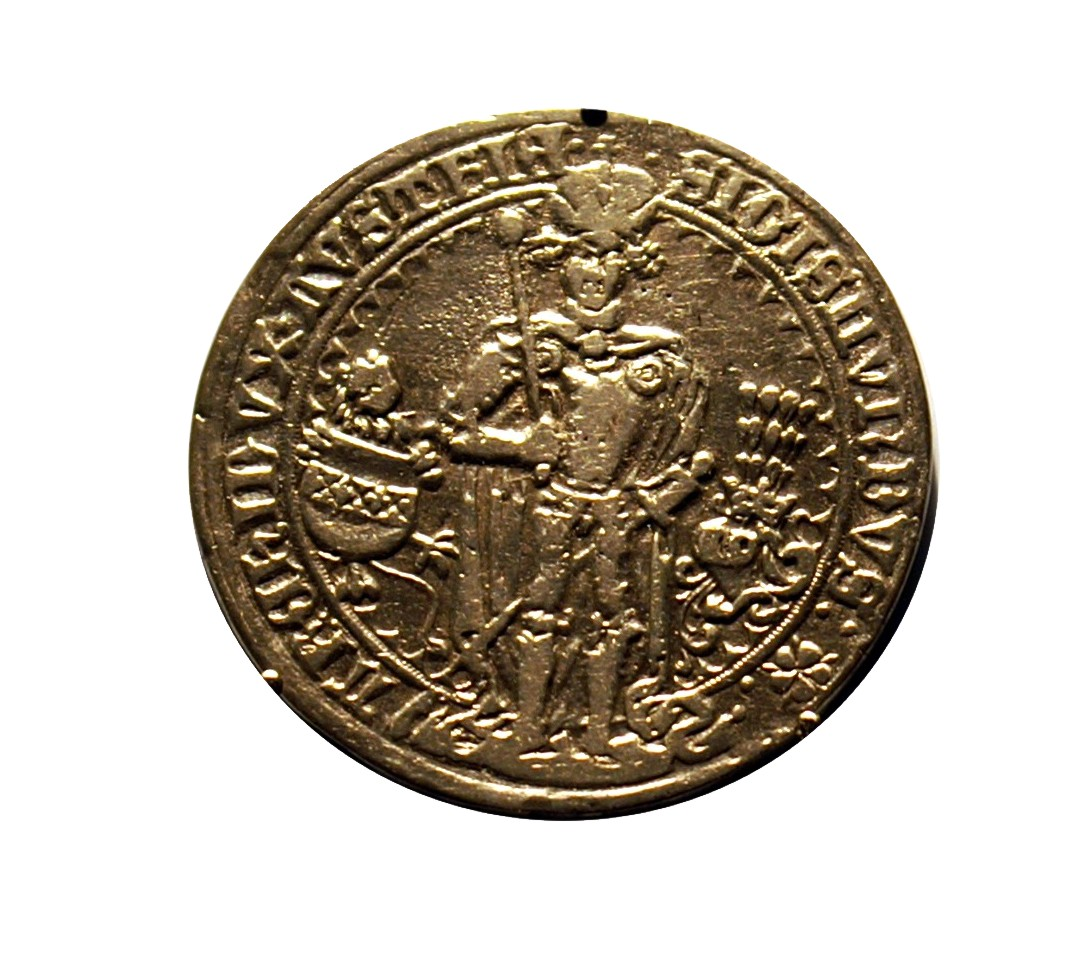
Guldengroschen

The original Tyrolean guldiner was designed so that eight coins minted would weigh in pure silver at one Tyrolean Mark. This was fine for the Tyrol, but much of Europe was accustomed to measuring by the more widely used Cologne mark. The penultimate development of the guldiner occurred in 1518 when the Joachimsthal mint in Jagiellon-controlled Bohemia slightly altered the weight of the coin from 31.93 g down to 29.23 g. This made it possible to mint nine guldiners to have the silver weight equivalent of one Cologne Mark, rather than the eight in Tirol. This new coin was known as the Joachimsthaler (Joachimsthal guldiner), but like the guldengroschen being contracted to guldiner, the Joachimsthaler became known simply as the thaler. This new coin was an instant success and was the great grandfather of many other similar weight coins like the daalder, dollar, tolar, tallero, etc.

The 1524 Reichsmünzordnung defined a standard Guldengroschen for the Holy Roman Empire, at 1/8th Cologne Mark of silver, 15/16 fine - hence, 27.405 g fine silver. It was valued at 60 kreuzer in 1524 and 72 kreuzer after 1555. This imperial Guldengroschen ended in 1566 with the issuance of the Reichsthaler, which contained less silver (25.984 g), but was also valued at 72 kreuzer.

700 Years City of Hall in Tyrol commemorative coin

== Guldengroschen represented in other coins ==
Guldengroschen itself, has been the main motive for many collectors coins and medals. One of the most recent is the Austrian 700 Years City of Hall in Tyrol commemorative coin, minted on January 29, 2003. The reverse side of the coin shows the Guldiner silver coin. However, the design is negative, representing a coin die, as a reference to Hall’s history as a significant centre for minting coins.

== Literature ==
- Miller, Manfred (2020). Münzverwaltungslehre at academia.edu. Retrieved 30 May 2022.
