= Reichsmünzordnung =

The Reichsmünzordnung (German: [ˈʁaɪçsˌmʏntsˌʔɔʁdnʊŋ], "imperial minting ordinance") was an attempt to unify the numerous disparate coins in use in the various states of the Holy Roman Empire in the 16th century.

The ordinance was issued in several steps at Diets at Augsburg during the 1530s to 1560s, but it was never adopted entirely by all princes within the empire.

A first Reichsmünzordnung was issued by Charles V in 1524 at Esslingen, declaring the Cologne Mark as the general standard for coin weights. But due to protests by the larger principalities of the empire, the ordinance was never implemented.

In 1551, the Kreuzer was introduced as the standard for small silver coinage, with 72 Kreuzer being equivalent to a Gulden, or a silver Guldengroschen. The silver Taler was set at 68 Kreuzer. An official Reichsgoldgulden was introduced but was only minted for a few years. The definition of a gold and a silver coin (Gulden vs. Guldengroschen) of equivalent value was problematic, as the value of the gold coin tended to rise above that of the silver one, and soon the Gulden was de facto traded at more than the official 72 Kreuzer. This led to the abolition of the official standard linking of gold and silver coins in 1559 under Ferdinand I. The Gulden was now set at 75 Kreuzer, the Ducat was introduced as an additional gold coin, and the Guldengroschen, now valued 60 Kreuzer, gradually fell out of use in favour of the Taler.

In 1566, the Diet was forced to recognize the new status quo and introduced the Reichstaler (at 29.23 grams of 88.9% silver) as the official coin of the empire. The Taler remained in use throughout the Holy Roman Empire until the early 18th century.
