= Blaffert =

Blaffert was the name of two different types of historical European coin. It was also called the Blafferd or, in Upper German, the Plappart, Plappert or Blaphart. It derives from the French blafard meaning "pale" or "bright".

== Southern Germany, Alsace, Switzerland ==
The Plappart was a groschen coin of the late Middle Ages, particularly widespread in Upper Germany. It developed around 1420 from the slightly less valuable schilling. One gulden was worth 20, 24 or 26 Plappert, one Plappert was worth 9, 10, 12, 13, 15 or 17 Stäbler or 15, 16, 18, 19 or 22 Haller. The southern German Blaffert was struck on both sides.

It was probably first minted in Constance, later also in other Swabian cities (e.g. Ulm in 1429) and in Switzerland (from 1384/88 in Bern, 1417 in Zürich, 1424 in St. Gallen, 1425 in Basel). In Switzerland it was the largest silver coin at this time until the introduction of the Dicken in 1482 and was replaced by the Batzen from the beginning of the 16th century. In Switzerland, however, the coin seems to have been in circulation until the 18th century.

== Northern Germany ==
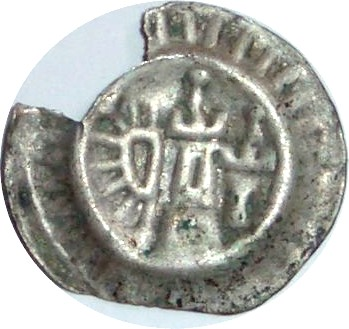
Hamburg Blaffert, 15th century

The Blaffert was a coin worth two Pfennigs in northern Germany (documented: "penninghen von tween penninghen"). They were minted by the cities of Lübeck, Hamburg and Lüneburg. In the recesses (agreements) of the Wendish Coin Treaty, the towns agreed on the appearance and weight of the Blafferts. Two types were distinguished. The first was double-sided and minted in the 14th and 16th centuries. In design, it was like a reduced version of the Witte minted at the same time. The second was minted in the 15th century. Like the Hohlpfennigs, it had a curved edge and was only stamped on one side, which is why this type is also called the Hohlblaffert ("hollow Blaffert").

== Lower Rhine, Middle Rhine ==
A coin table from Jülich-Berg shows that there was a Cologne silver coin in the Bergisches Land from the 18th century to 1824 that also bore this name. According to the Stadt Düsseldorffischen Policey- und Tax-Ordnung of 7 July 1706, drawn up by Duke John William, 1 Reichsthaler was worth 8 schillings or 60 Stübers or 20 Blafferts. In 1733, Blafferts were used as a means of payment in Linz am Rhein and had a value of four Räderalbus. The author from Lüttringhausen also mentioned this term in Daniel Schürmann's Practischem Schulbuch zur allgemeinen Rechenkunst und Geometrie.

On 1 December 1738, the Imperial Commission Decree (Kommissionsdecret) of Emperor Charles VI, associated with the recognition of the Leipzig standard as the new imperial coin standard, the Lower Rhine Blaffert was mentioned as a division of the Thaler permitted in the Empire and as a double Blaffert was a currency coin worth 9 Kreuzers. The following state coins were also listed in the commission decree as coins for the Lower Rhine region: 4 1/2 Kreuzer = 1 Blaffert, 2 1/4 Kreuzer = 1/2 Blaffert, 1 1/2 Kreuzer = 1 Stüber, Cologne Albus = 1/4 Blaffert, half Stüber = 3/4 Kreuzer.

== Scandinavia ==
Stemming from northern Germany, under Archbishop Erik Valkendorf (1510–1522) in Nidaros (present day Trondheim) unilaterally minted Blafferts worth 2 Pfennigs or 1/6 Norwegian Schilling were struck. Two-sided copper Blafferts were issued in Denmark from 1602.

== Literature ==
- Daniel Schmutz: Plappart in German, French and Italian in the online Historical Dictionary of Switzerland.
- Badisches Wörterbuch, Vol. II p. 245, Article: Plappert.
- Deutsches Rechtswörterbuch, Vol. II col. 358, Article: Blaffer(t).
- Schwäbisches Wörterbuch, Vol. I colp. 1155 f., Article: Plappert.
- Schweizerisches Idiotikon, Vol. V colp. 128–134, Article: Plapper(t), einschließlich Zusammensetzungen.
- Norsk historisk leksikon, Article: Blaffert.
- O. C. Gaedechens (1854), Verein für Hamburgische Geschichte (ed.), Hamburgische Münzen und Medaillen (in German), Hamburg
