= Batzen =

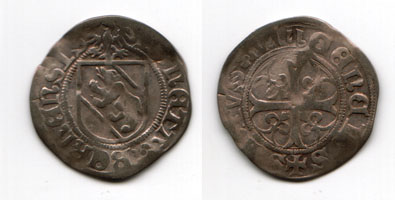
Bernese batzen (15th century)

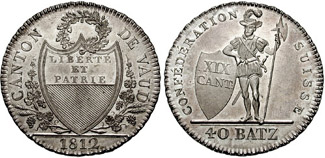
40-Batzen Thaler, Vaud, 1812

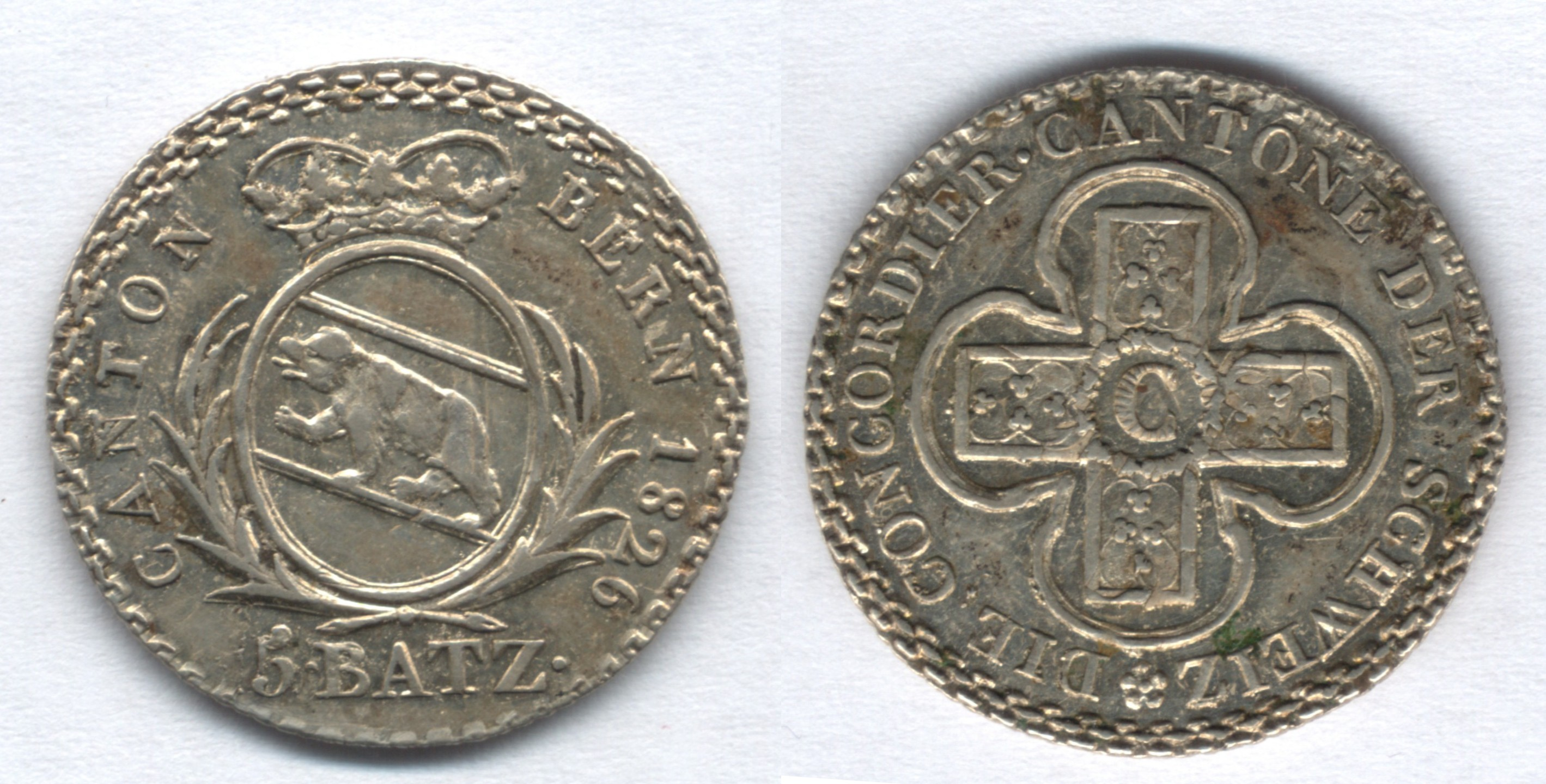
Bern: 5 Batzen 1826, concordat type

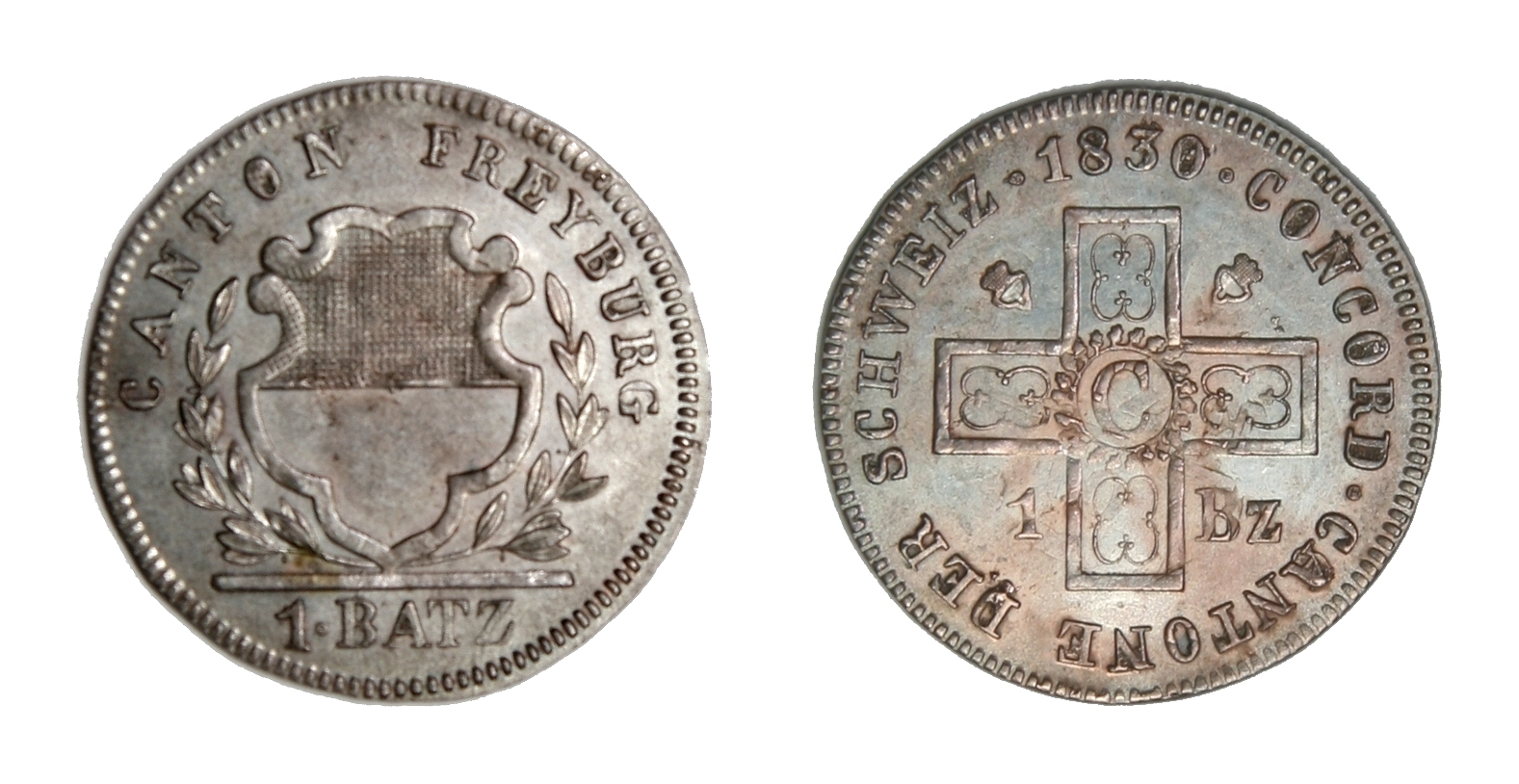
Freiburg (Freyburg): 1 Batzen 1830

The batzen is a historical Swiss, south German, and Austrian coin. It was first produced in Bern, Switzerland, from 1492 and remained in use there until the mid-19th century.

== Name ==
Bernese chronicler Valerius Anshelm explained the word through folk etymology, stating that it came from Bëtz ("bear"), the heraldic animal of the Swiss canton, which was embossed on the reverse of the coin. The word probably derives from the Upper German (particularly Bavarian) batzen ("stick together") or Batzen ("lump, thick piece"), as it referred to a Dickpfennig ("fat pfennig").

== History ==
A double Plappart, soon known as a Batzen, was minted in Bern from 1492. The minting of Batzen in Salzburg is also attested early, in 1495.

The Batzen was originally minted in silver, but from the 17th century in billon. The value of the Batzen varied over time depending on where it was minted. The value of a Bernese Batzen initially corresponded to four Kreuzer. As the Gulden was worth 60 Kreuzer, the value of 1 Batzen (4 Kreuzer) in Bern, Freiburg, and Solothurn also corresponded to one-fifteenth of a Gulden. Later there were also Grossi ('thick ones', i.e., Groschen) worth 5 Batzen. Other places of the Old Confederation and some southern German states soon followed Bern's example. Zürich minted 16 Batzen to the Gulden from 1500 onwards. In 1564, a Thaler was worth 16 Constance Batzen. Around 1600, 1 Bocksthaler (Schaffhausen Thaler) was worth 17 Batzen or 68 Kreuzer, so 1 Batzen = 1/17 Thaler = 4 Kreuzer. In the early 18th century, the Hohlbatzen ('hollow Batzen') was valued at five Kreuzer (1/12 Reichsgulden), while the regular Batzen was four Kreuzer. Basel and Zürich Batzen were valued at 1/18 Gulden, and the St. Gallen Batzen at 1/17 . In the latter half of the 18th century, values included 1 Reichsbatzen worth 16 Pfennigs, 1 Zürich Batzen worth 15 Pfennigs, and 1 Bernese or 1 Chur Batzen worth 14 Pfennigs.

The Batzen became a widespread intermediate currency between the numerous large and small silver coins circulating in Europe. Since some South German Batzen were of varying quality, the Reichstag in 1522 and 1524 legislated against these coins. In southern Germany they were minted until 1536 but were banned by the Imperial Minting Ordinance of 1559. However, in places like Nuremberg, it was still in use as a currency designation in 1564. In Switzerland, on the other hand, the Batzen remained unchallenged.

During the counterfeiting period known as the Kipper and Wipper period, the Batzen denomination was also used for some interim coins. For example, in Thuringia inter alia (at the mints of Gotha (1621–1623) and Weimar (1619–1622)), Kipper coins worth three and six Batzen were minted (the Dreibätzner and Sechsbätzner). The coins were not subject to objection, as they were state coins, not Thaler coins or divisions thereof, which had to conform to imperial coinage regulations.

Even after the Munich Coinage Treaty of 1837, Batzen were minted as Scheidemünzen valued at four Kreuzers in some member states, for example in the Free City of Frankfurt. The coins were in use until the introduction of the Mark in 1871. As late as 1873, the increase in the price of beer by the Frankfurt breweries from 4 to 4½ Kreuzer triggered the Frankfurt beer riot, which began with the demand "I want Batzen beer" (Mir wolle Batzebier) and led to serious social unrest.

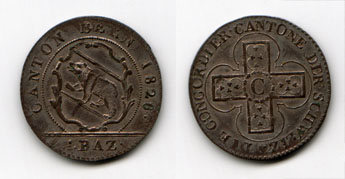
Konkordatsbatzen minted in Bern (1826)

When the Helvetic Republic introduced a single Swiss currency for the first time in 1798–1803, the Batzen was also integrated into the system. One franc was worth ten Batzen, and one Batzen ten centimes. Ten Swiss francs were equivalent to a Louis d'or. After the end of the single currency, coin sovereignty was returned to the cantons, some of which retained the decimal Franc-Batzen-Rappen division (Aargau, city of Basel, Bern, Freiburg, Lucerne, Solothurn, Unterwalden, Uri, Vaud, Valais, Zug). Only in the canton of Neuchâtel was a franc worth 10½ Batzen. The other cantons introduced currencies with a Gulden-Schilling or Florin-Livre system. The era of the Batzen ended in 1850 with the introduction of the new Swiss franc as the single Swiss currency. An old franc did not correspond to a new franc. Seven Batzen could be exchanged for a new franc in 1850. In Swiss colloquial usage, the Batzen became a term for the 10 Rappen (10 cent) coin.
