= Witte (coin) =

Hamburg Witte (minted 1379–1387)

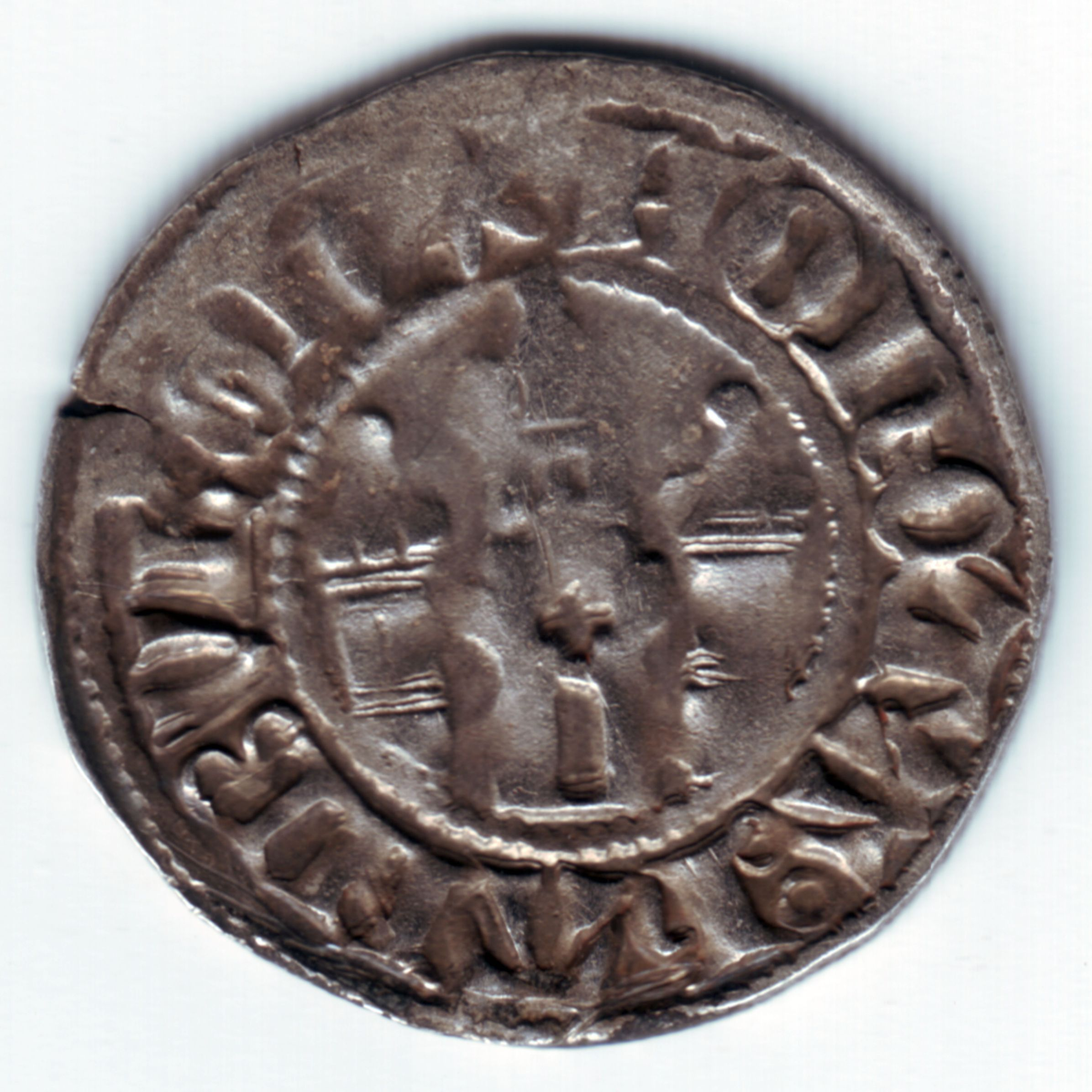
Obverse with text MONETA HAMBURGN

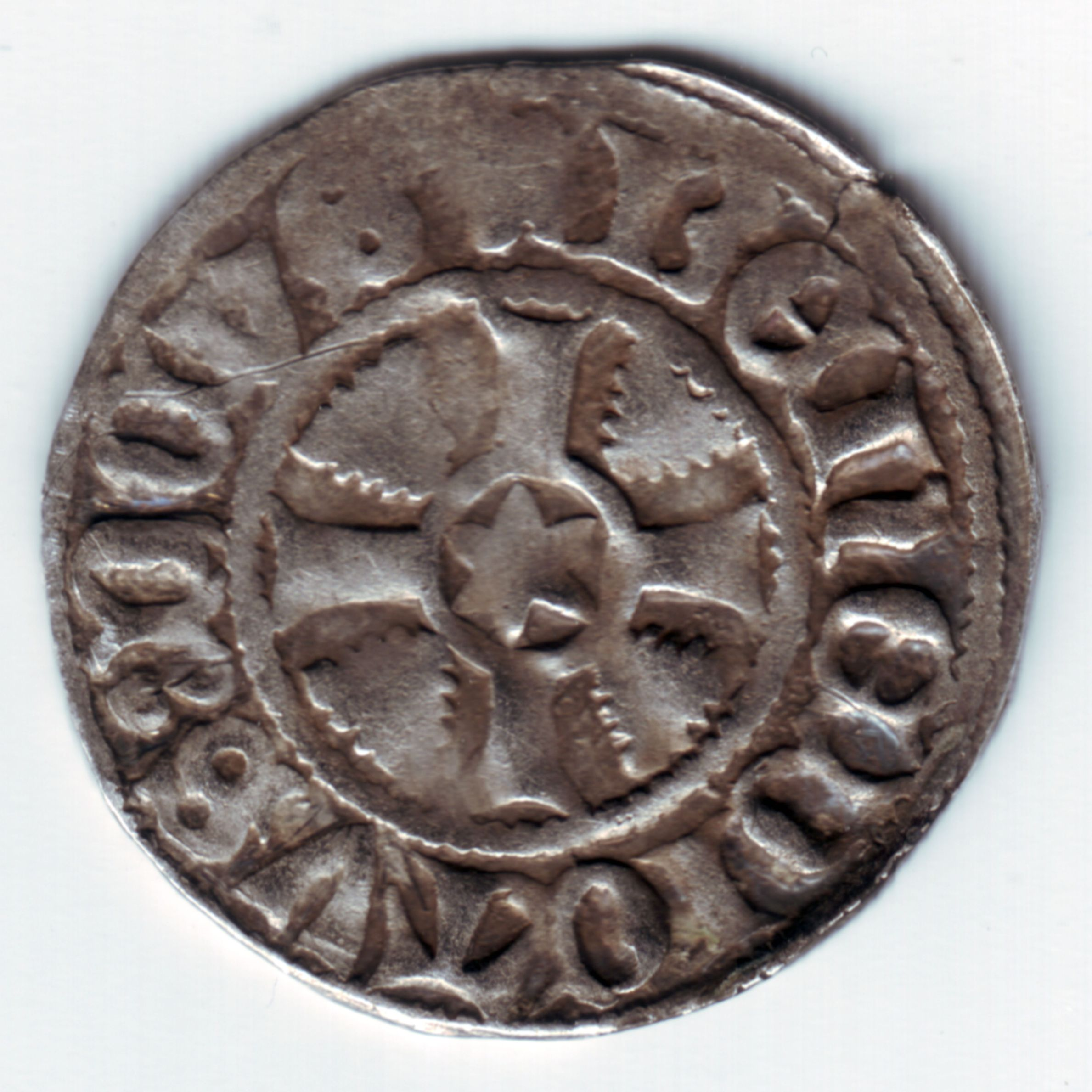
Reverse with text BENEDICTUS DEUS

The Witte, also called a Witten, Wittenpfennig, or Veerling, was the name of an historical north German coin stamped on both sides with a value of four pfennigs. The coin received this colloquial name because of its white appearance, which was caused by the oxidation of the copper. In documents the Witte was called the penningh van veer penninghen ("pfennig of four pfennigs"). In Denmark-Norway the coin was called the Hvide.

Witten were minted from 1330, starting in Lübeck and in the northern German cities of Hamburg and Wismar. The cities of Lüneburg, Rostock and Stralsund followed, the coins having different compositions, but a common appearance, weight and fineness based on the agreements of the Wendish Coinage Treaty. Outside of the Wendish Minting Union, Witten emerged in towns in Pomerania and in Holstein.

In the course of the 15th century, the Witte was replaced by other denominations, the Dreiling, Sechsling, Schilling and Double Schilling. After that it was only minted once more by the Wendish Minting Union, and then only for a short time at the beginning of the 16th century. These Witten were imitated in the County of Hoya, in Diepholz and Rietberg, in the Bishopric of Verden and in Stade.
