= Wendish Coinage Treaty =

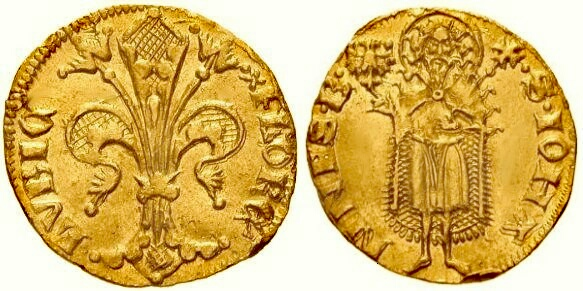
Lübeck Goldgulden, 1341

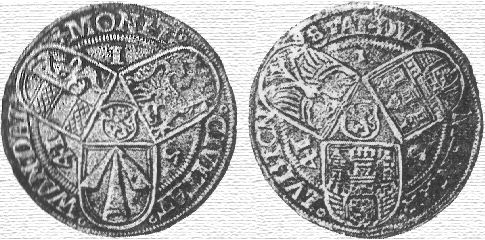
Wendenthaler, Lüneburg, 1541

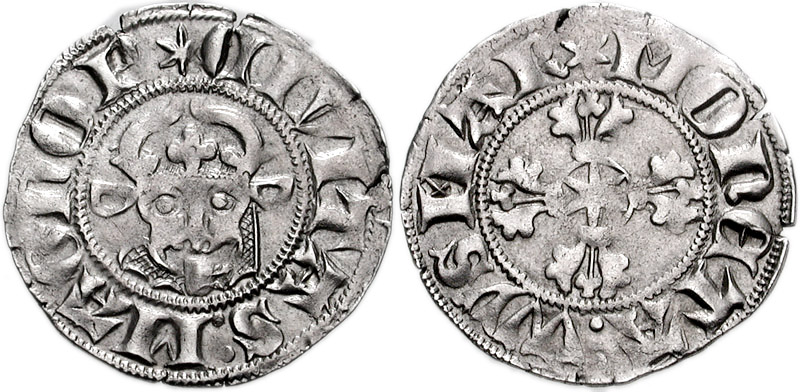
Witten, Wismar, post 1379

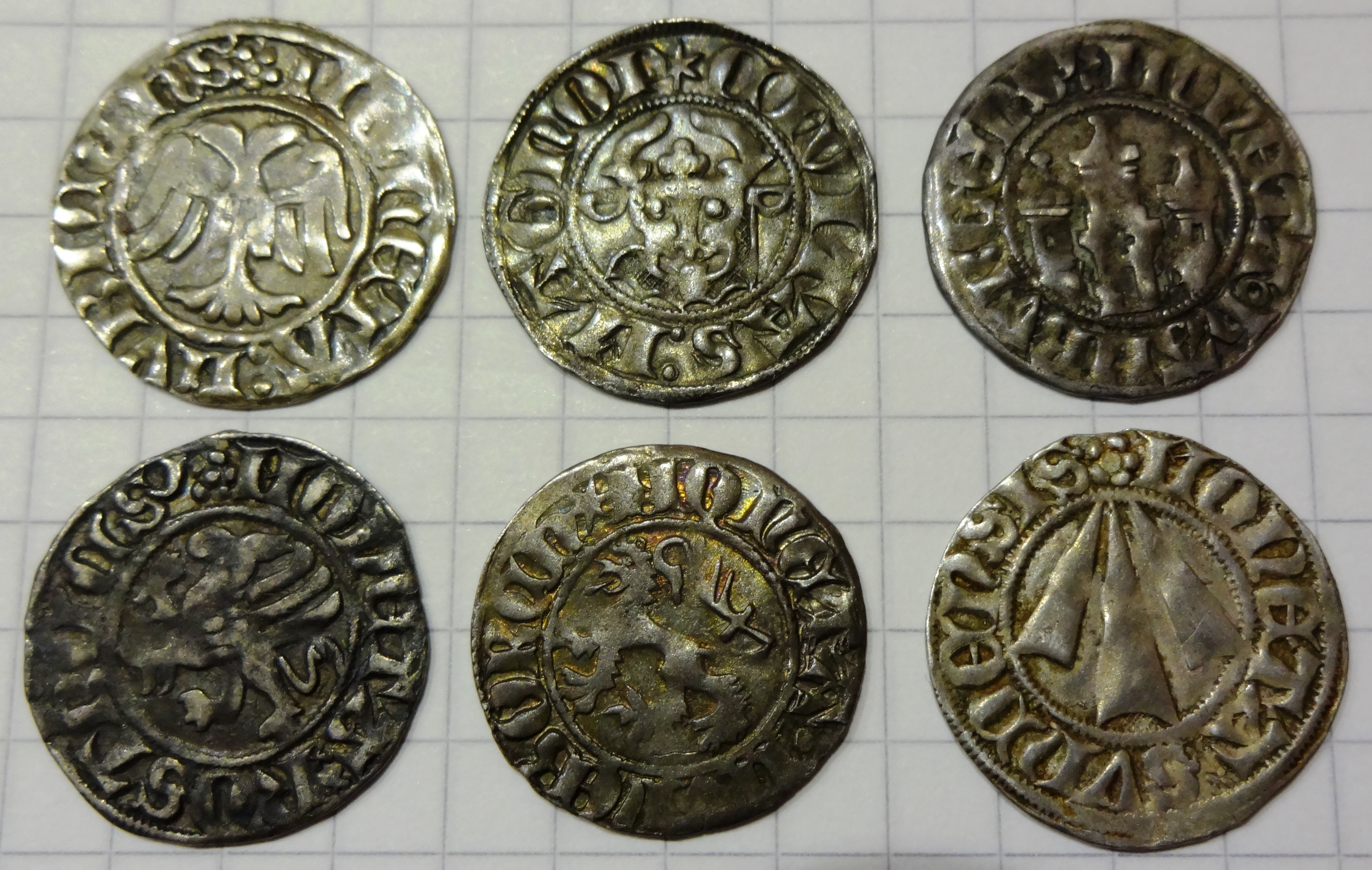
Wittens from: Lübeck, Wismar, Hamburg, Rostock, Lüneburg, Stralsund (14th C)

The Wendish Coinage Union (German: Wendischer Münzverein) was an organisation bound by treaty formed by the North German Hanseatic towns from 1379 to the 16th century whose aim was to have standardised coinage regulations.

The core cities involved were Lübeck, Hamburg, Wismar, Lüneburg, but they were joined for a time by Rostock, Stralsund and Hanover. The basis was the Lübeck Mark (Lübische Mark), from which coins known as State Marks (Staatsmark) were struck from 1506 to 1530. Furthermore, a number of coin denominations were minted with fractional values of the Lübeck Mark. These were:

- The Witten valued at 4 Pfennigs, the ##Viertelwitten (1/4 Witte, Hohlpfennigs ("hollow pfennigs),
- Dreilings, Sechslings, Blafferts
- Various Schilling coins.

Lüneburg also minted the so-called Wendenthaler, which was also valid in the Coinage Union.

The common symbol on the coins was a six-pointed star in the middle of a cross. This symbol was subsequently imitated by many towns in Mecklenburg, Pomerania and Holstein, without them being members of the Wendish Coinage Union.

A coinage association (Münzbund) that functioned in a similar way was the Rhenish Coinage Union (Rheinische Münzverein).

After the enactment of the Augsburg Imperial Minting Ordinance (Reichsmünzordnung) of 1566 and the formation of the Lower Saxon coinage circle, the towns associated in the Wendish Coinage Union also accepted the Thaler currency. The 7 February 1569 was probably the last minting date of the Wendish Coinage Union. In the Imperial Circle ordinances for coinage of 1568 and 1572, minting was carried out according to the new provisions, whereby the Union dissolved itself.

== See also ==
- Hamburg Mint

== Literature ==
- Wilhelm Jesse: Der Wendische Münzverein. Reprint with supplements and improvements, Brunswick 1967. VIII p., 1 sheet, 322 p., 37 plates.
