= Wendenthaler =

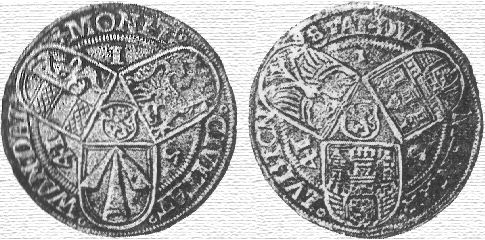
Wendenthaler, Lüneburg, 1541

The Wendenthaler or Wendentaler was a currency coin minted in Lüneburg from 1541, which depicted the six coats of arms of the Wendish towns.

These included the coats of arms of Rostock and Stralsund. The coin bore the inscription "Statutus duarum Marcarum Lubicensis", i.e. "Fixed at two Lübeck Marks". Its value was 2 Marks = 28.70 g.

This inscription of its value in Marks by the Hanseatic League as part of the Wendish Coinage Union remained until 1550. It was then replaced by the Thaler. Nevertheless, the Mark remained in the North Sea area as a unit of account worth 16 Schillings until the 17th century.

In 1975 there was a special minting of a silver medal, which had the coats of arms of Lübeck, Hamburg and Lüneburg on the obverse, and a circular inscription within a double notched circle. On the reverse were the coats of arms of Wismar, Rostock and Stralsund, again with a circular inscription inside a double notched circle, 42 mm, 24 g PF.
