= Dreiling =

Dreiling is German for "three of a kind" or "three-er" and may refer to:

== Surnames ==
Notable people with the surname include:

- Dylan Dreiling (born 2003), American baseball player and 2024 College World Series Most Outstanding Player
- Greg Dreiling (born 1963), American basketball player
- Nate Dreiling (born 1990), American football player

== Other meanings ==
- Dreiling (coin), an historical coin of the Holy Roman Empire worth 3 pfennigs
