= Dreikreuzer =

Austrian coin

The Dreikreuzer ("triple kreuzer"), also referred to as a Landgroschen ("state groschen") or Kaisergroschen ("emperor groschen"), was the name of a coin minted in Austria from the middle of the 16th century, but which is not mentioned in the imperial minting ordinances. As an important fiat coin or scheidemünze, it was struck in large quantities, especially in the 17th century and in Austria as well as other southern German states to pay for their troops.

The embossing usually portrayed an image of the prince and the Imperial Eagle or the respective national coat of arms. On one side the Dreikreuzer depicted the number 3 within an oval shape.

In Silesia, the Dreikreuzer was also known under the name Böhm, which probably stood for "Bohemian groschen".

== Literature ==
- "Dreikreuzer" in: Friedrich von Schrötter: Wörterbuch der Münzkunde, Berlin [etc.] 1930, p. 161.
