= Großpfennig =

A Großpfennig ("great pfennig") or Großer Pfennig (Latin: denarius grossus) was a Pomeranian pfennig coin of the 14th and 15th centuries. It also referred, in a more general sense, to any coin whose value was a multiple of the pfennig.

== History ==
The Großpfennig was minted jointly in 1395 by the towns of Anklam, Greifswald and Stralsund, who were members of the Pomeranian Coin Union (Pommersche Münzverein). It was based on the Lübische Sechsling ("Lübeck sixer"), a coin with a value of six pfennigs. A total of 144 coins was minted from a 12-lot mark. Its fine weight was 1.22 grammes and it had a gross weight of 1.629 grammes. These older Großpfennig coins were probably minted to the Lübeck coinage standard.

In 1428, the towns signed a second minting treaty with Duke Barnim VIII of Pomerania-Wolgast-Barth, Duke Wartislaw IX of Pomerania-Wolgast and Duke Casimir V (VI) of Pomerania-Stettin, which the towns of Demmin and Stettin also joined. The coin was now minted to the lighter Wendish standard of the Stralsund mark. This specified that 106 coins should be minted from an 8¼-lot mark. Its fine weight was 1.14 grammes and gross weight 2.2 grammes.

The tows of Gartz, Pyritz and Stargard also issued Großpfennigs in the 15th century.

On the obverse of the coins was the coat of arms of the respective town or a cross. A gryphon was depicted on the reverse.

== Literature ==
- Heinz Fengler; Gerhard Gierow; Willy Unger (1988), Transpress Lexikon Numismatik (in German) (4. bearbeitete ed.), Berlin: transpress VEB Verlag für Verkehrswesen, p. 166, ISBN 3-344-00220-1
