= State coin =

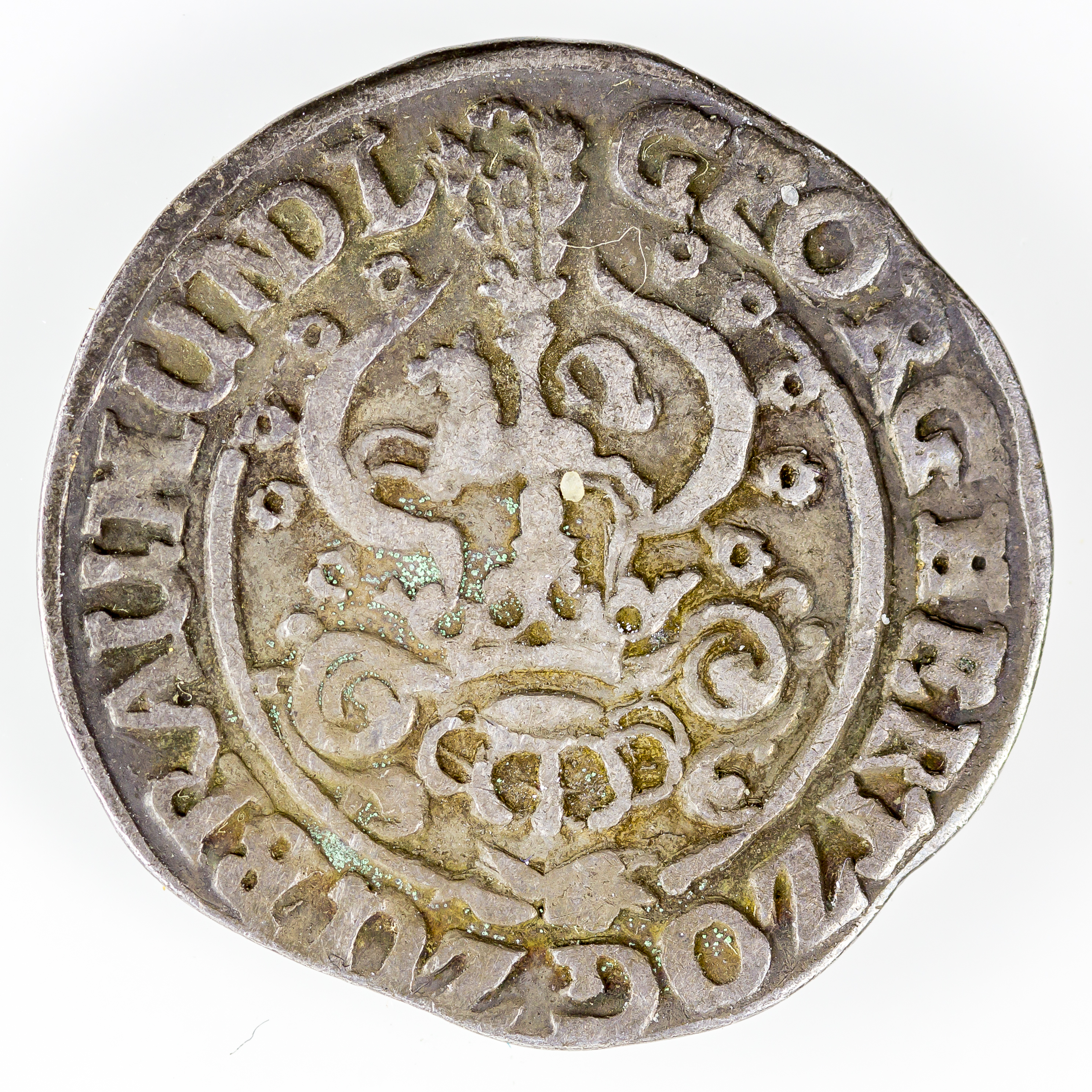
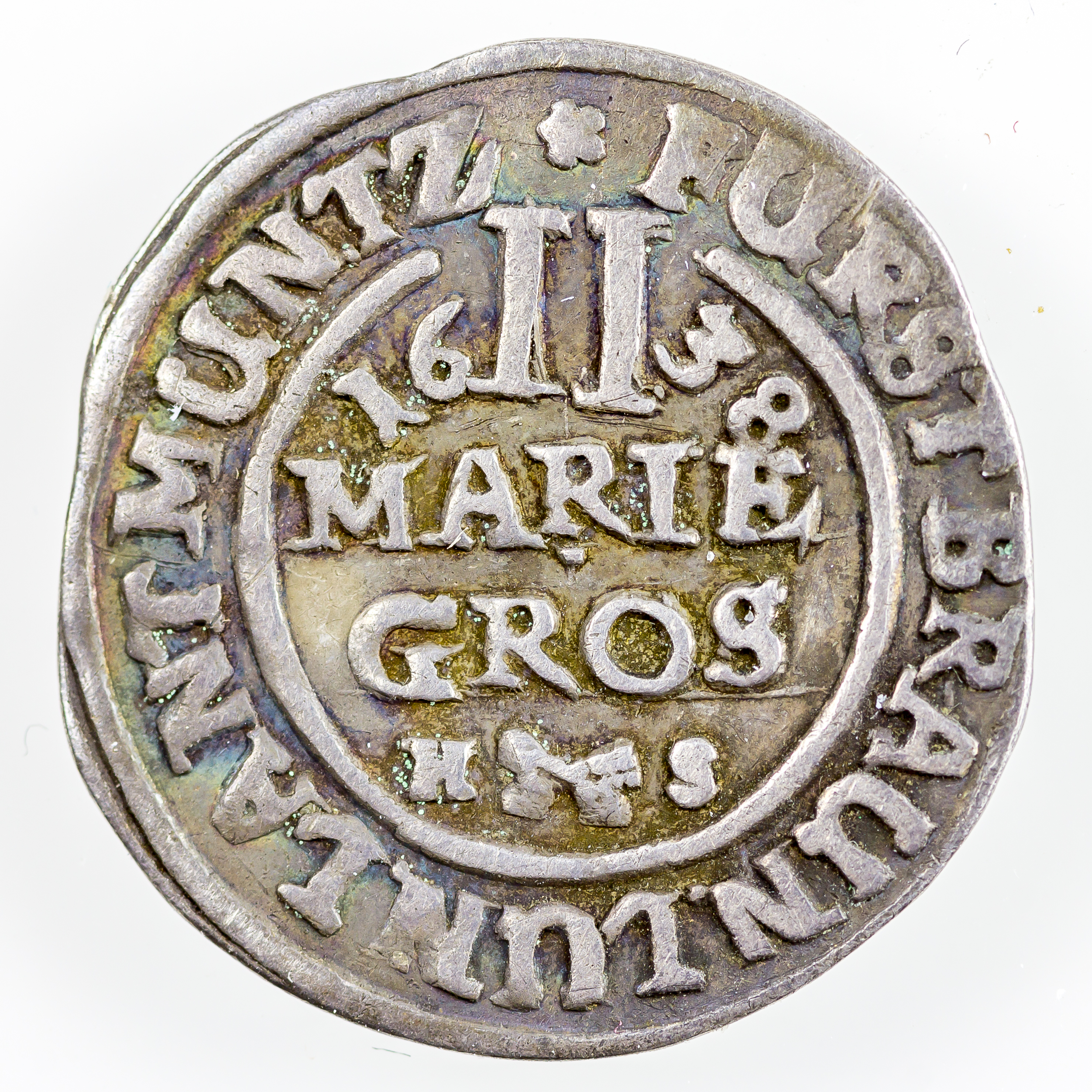
George, Principality of Calenberg, 2 Mariengroschen state coins, 1638 (Gerhard Welter, 1462)

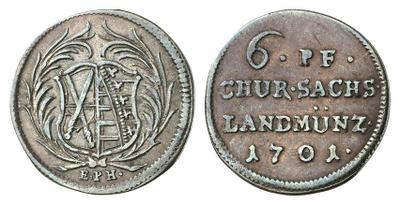
Augustus II, Electorate of Saxony, 6 Pfennige state coin, 1701 Roter Seufzer, Leipzig Mint

During the Kipper and Wipper period and until the late 18th century, state coins (Landmünzen} in the German part of the Holy Roman Empire were those that were not minted according to the relevant imperial standard (Reichsfuß), but using a lesser alloy and thus were only fit for circulation in the territory of their mint masters. There were therefore a type of fiat coin known as a Scheidemünze.

State coins were mostly issued in smaller denominations, but from 1687 even Brandenburg 2/3 thalers bore the designation “Brandenb. Landmünz."

The term "state coin" (Landmünze) should not be confused with the term "national coins" or "state coinage" (Landesmünzen), which includes all the coins issued by a country.

== See also ==
- Kipper mints (Electoral Saxony)
- Kippertaler

== Bibliography ==
- Kroha, Tyll (1997). Großes Lexikon der Numismatik. 2nd edn. Gütersloh: Bertelsmann Lexikon Verlag.
- Schrötter, Friedrich Frh (1970).Wörterbuch der Münzkunde. 2nd, unchanged print of the 1930 edn. Berlin: Walter de Gruyter.
