= Roter Seufzer =

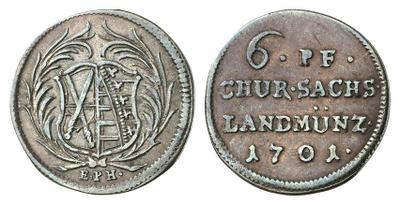
6 Pfennig piece, 1701, Roter Seufzer" from the Leipzig Mint, mmz. E.P.H., mintmaster Ernst Peter Hecht

The Roter Seufzer ("red sigh"), also called the Seufzer and Leipziger Seufzer, was the popular name of the inferior six-pfennig coin minted in huge quantities in 1701 and 1702 by the Prince-Elector of Saxony and King of Poland, Augustus the Strong (1694–1733). The name of these coins was due to the loss that the population suffered as a result of the coins which had a high copper content.

== History ==
In the years 1701 and 1702 the Leipzig Mint in the Electorate of Saxony minted large numbers of six-pfennig pieces. These coins initially bore a thin layer of high-quality silver, which quickly wore out in circulation, revealing an almost copper-red coin. The Roter Seufzers were struck from just under 2 lots of silver (122/1000 silver; billon) and weighed 1.62 g. The coin inscription "LANDMÜNZ." meant that it was a state coin and therefore did not have to comply with the Imperial Minting Ordinance, which was actually the case. The design of the Roter Seufzer was based on the inferior Brandenburg six pfennig pieces which were nicknamed Rote Sechser ("red sixers") or Spieß and minted under Elector Frederick William of Brandenburg (1640–1688) and his successor Frederick III (I) (1688–1713) from 1676 to 1711.

August II had two lots of the sixers struck in quick succession with a converted face value of 280,000 Thalers each. The king made a net profit of 236,000 thalers from both items. The Leipzig mintmaster, Ernst Peter Hecht, survived the economic crisis caused by the inferior sixers unchallenged. The mintmaster clearly did not take responsibility for the large numbers of low-value pfennig coins with his mintmaster's mark E.P.H., which flooded the Electorate.

=== Finger pointing ===
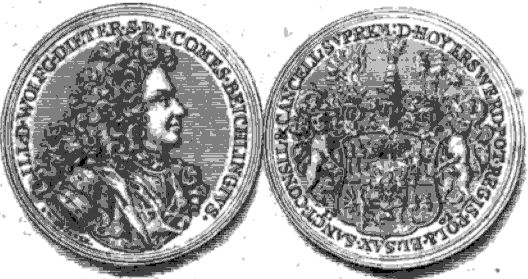
Portrait of Beichlingen on a "medal of the fallen [...] Count [...] by A. 1702” – from Köhler's Münzbelustigungen ("Coin Fun"). (Medalist J. W. Höckner, Dresden Mint.) The blame for the coinage scandal was shifted to Beichlingen.

The King blamed the coin scandal on Grand Chancellor and Privy Council, Wolf Dietrich, Count of Beichlingen, who had fallen out of favour in 1702 because of his issue of a Bankothaler (Beichlingscher Ordenstaler). However, Beichlingen denied having arranged for the sixes to be issued:

He [Beichlingen] humbly pointed out that he hadn't done anything without special orders and would take the liberty of reminding the king that he himself had ordered the objectionable money to be issued [...] in order that he could purchase certain jewels. He, the chancellor, presented his concerns but was not heard. The King himself ordered the minting of a second lot [...] of such sixers and actually made enjoyed a net profit of 236,000 thalers from these two issues. […]

— Walter Haupt

It was also the time of the Great Northern War (1700–1721) against the Sweden when Augustus II urgently needed funding.

=== Devaluation ===
The following is recorded in the Conversations Lexicon of 1831 on responsibility for the “plan of the financial company” and its effects:

Seufzer, also Red Seufzer, was the name of a small coin that was issued in 1701 by the Leipzig Mint. Because, as a result of the Seufzer, the Mark fine was issued to 32 Thlr., the population arbitrarily set their value from 6 pfennigs to 2 pfennigs. On 16 February 1703, King Augustus II ordered them to be accepted at 3 pfennigs each, but on 13 April conceded to the public and its circulation price value at 2 Pf. The plan for this financial enterprise is said to have come from Count Beichlingen. In 2 years more than half a million thalers of such Seufzers were minted.

— Conversations Lexikon, Vol. 10 (1831), p. 182.

It is not clear who was responsible for issuing the Red Seufzers. The inferior sixers were devalued to 3 pfennigs by the edict of 16 February 1703. However, the population did not rate them higher than 2 pfennigs and thus achieved a further devaluation through the edict of 13 April 1703. With that they harmed themselves herself the most, because the provincial banks now only had to redeem it at 2 pfennigs. In the end they were only used as gaming counters.

== See also ==
- Saxon coin history
- Kippertaler
- Böse Halser

== Literature ==
- Walther Haupt: Sächsische Münzkunde, Deutscher Verlag der Wissenschaften, Berlin 1974
- Heinz Fengler, Gerd Gierow, Willy Unger: transpress Lexikon Numismatik, Berlin 1976
- Friedrich von Schrötter, N. Bauer, K. Regling, A. Suhle, R. Vasmer] J. Wilcke: Wörterbuch der Münzkunde, Berlin 1970 (reprint of the original 1930 edn.)
- Gerhard Schön: Deutscher Münzkatalog 18. Jahrhundert, München 1984
- Allgemeine deutsche Real-Encyklopädie für die gebildeten Stände (Conversations-Lexikon), Vol. 10, Reutlingen 1831
