= Dreiling (coin) =

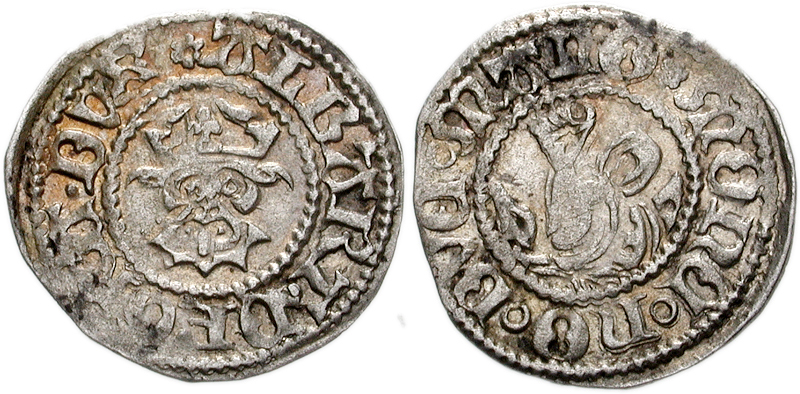
Trieling, Duchy of Mecklenburg, Albert VII, 1503

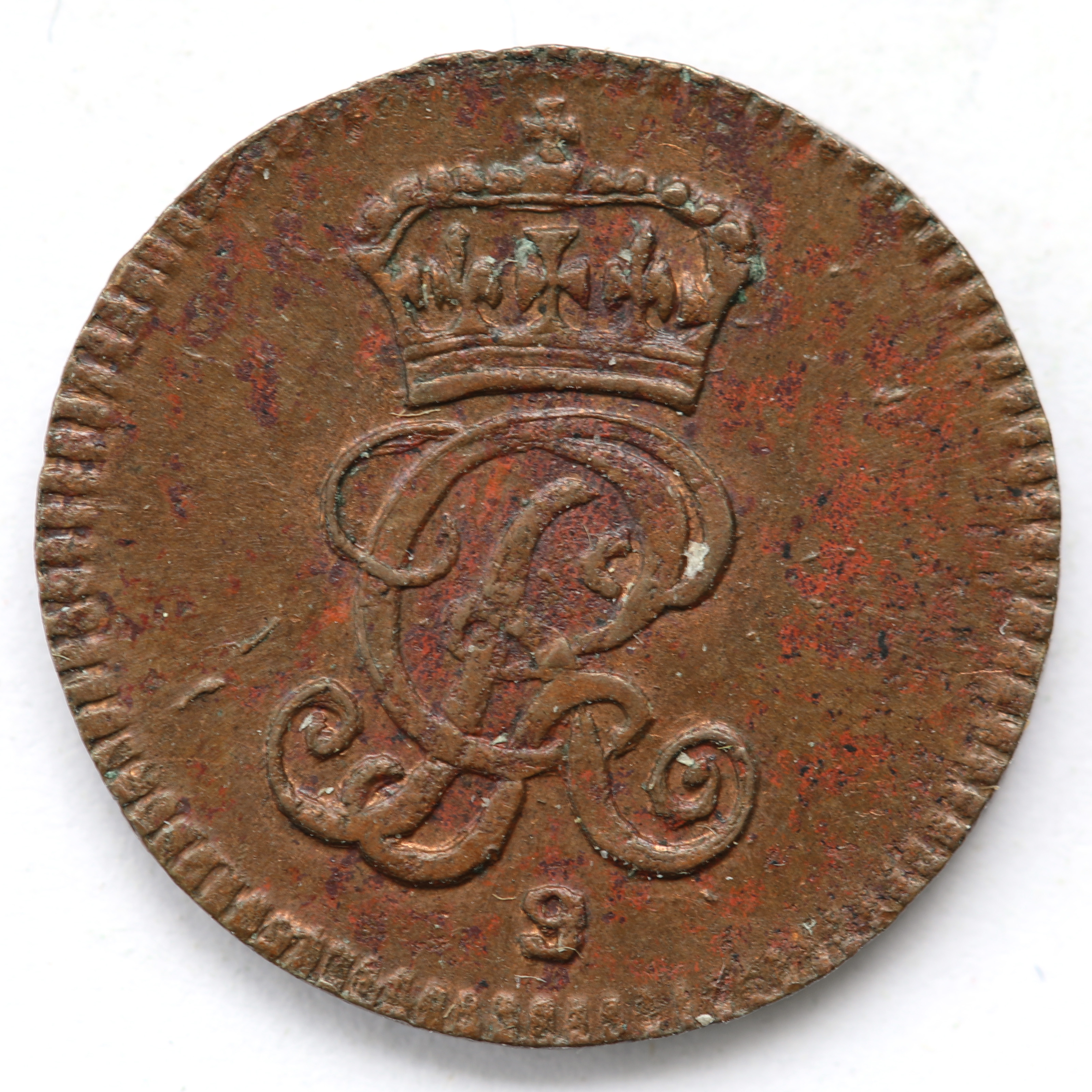
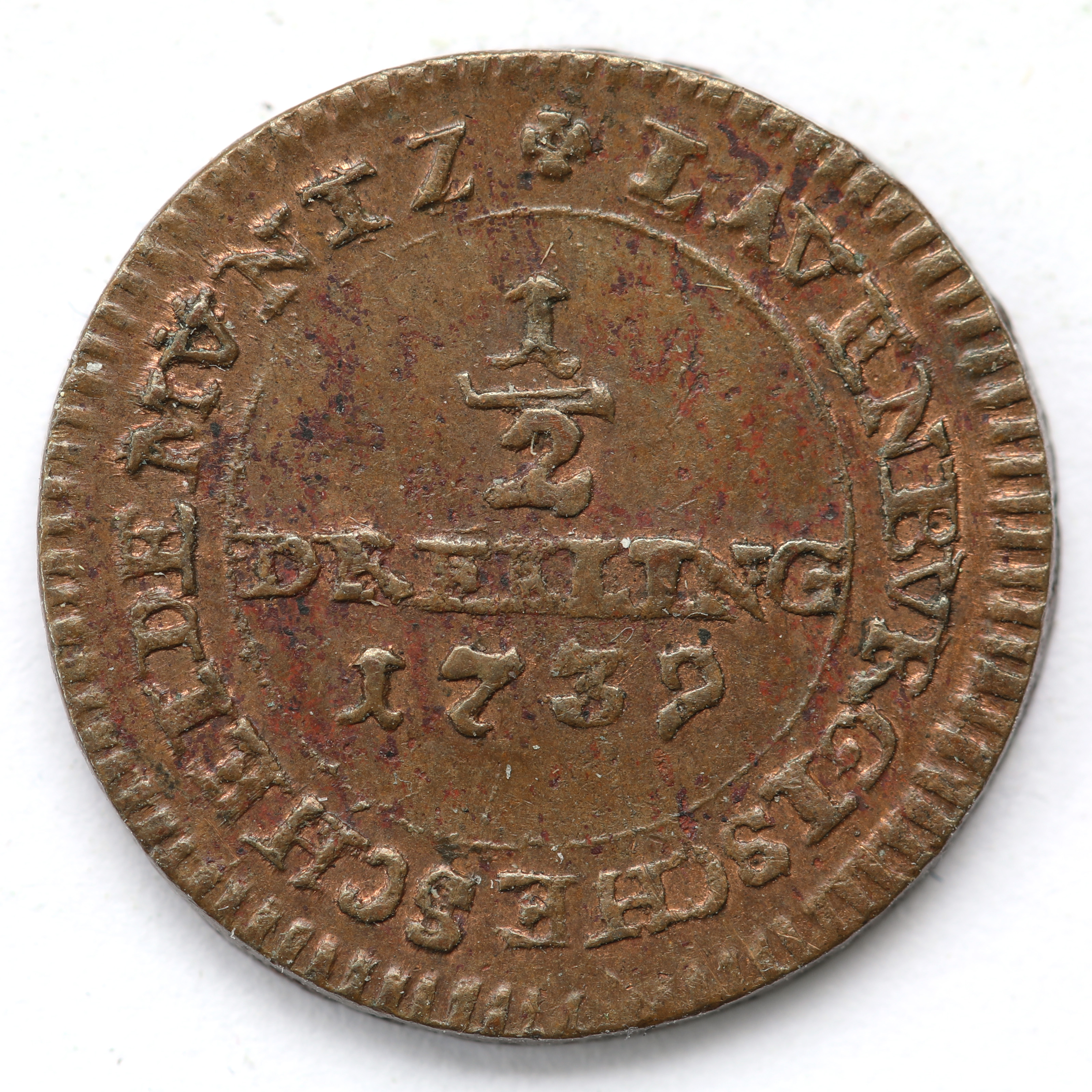
Cu 1/2 Dreiling Scheidemünze, Duchy of Saxe-Lauenburg, George II, 1739 (Gerhard Welter, 1812)

Dreiling (also Dreyling, Dreling or Driling, Latin ternarius, Danish trepenning) was the name of a type of fiat coin called a Scheidemünze that was worth three pfennigs.

Coins of the Dreiling type were first minted after 1374 in Lübeck and a little later in Hamburg. After the treaty (Rezess) of 1392, it was a coin in the Wendish Coinage Union. The participating cities of Lübeck, Hamburg, Lüneburg, Rostock and Wismar agreed on a uniform appearance for the Dreilings. It depicted the coat of arms of the respective city on both sides. Weight and silver content were also standardised. Some towns in Mecklenburg, Pomerania and in Denmark minted Dreilings without being a member of the Union.

After the dissolution of the Wendish Coinage Union in the middle of the 16th century, Dreilings continued to be minted in northern Germany until the middle of the 19th century, and were made of copper from the end of the 18th century. Schleswig-Holstein struck the last Dreiling in 1850/51 from copper and Hamburg in 1855 from a billon alloy.

Occasionally, the copper 1 1/2 pfennig coins of the 18th century were also referred to as Dreilinge, since they were worth 3 Hellers (Dreyheller).

== See also ==
- Dreier - a Saxon coin worth 3 groschen, later a Prussian-German coin worth 3 pfennigs
