= Schilling (coin) =

Class of coinage from central Europe

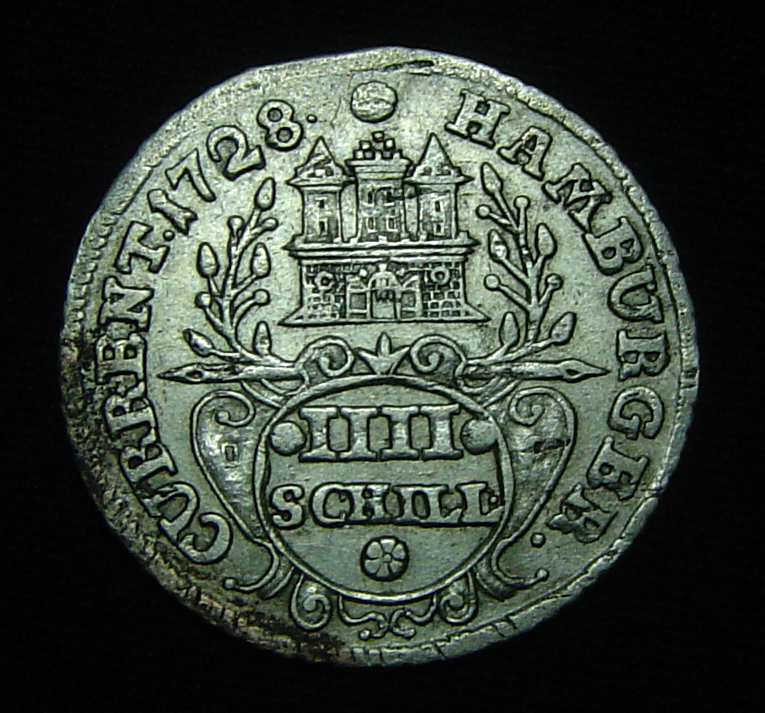
Reverse of a Hamburg 4 schilling currency coin (Courantmünze), 1728

The schilling was the name of a coin in various historical European states and which gave its name to the English shilling. The schilling was a former currency in many of the German-speaking states of the Holy Roman Empire, including the Hanseatic city states of Hamburg and Lübeck, the March of Brandenburg, and the Duchies of Bavaria, Mecklenburg, and Württemberg. It was also used in Switzerland and in Austria, where silver schillings were introduced as recently as 1923.

== History ==
The name schilling was originally given to the minted gold solidus, the late antique successor of the aureus. The coin reform under Charlemagne in 794 established a new silver currency which specified that:

1 silver Carolingian pound (equal to about 406½ grammes) = 20 schillings (solidi) = 240 pfennigs (denarii).

However, the silver solidus or schilling was not minted in Carolingian times. Only single silver pennies were struck. In the Empire of Francia from about 800 AD, only pure silver currency was valid, the coin weight of which was based on the pound. Gold solidi (gold schillings) were a rare exception. Thus the solidus was purely a coin of account as well as being a unit of weight and the gold equivalent of 12 silver pfennigs.

The silver content of the pfennigs fell over the next few centuries. From around 1150 onwards, in addition to the denar piccolo, which was greatly reduced in value, heavier multiple-denomination pfennigs denarii grossi were minted in northern Italy. From the Italian Grossino (denarius grossus) came the name Groschen. Depending on the local monetary situation, these multiple pfennigs had double, often 12 times and up to 20 times the value of the single, debased pfennig. The schilling was no longer just a name for a quantity of 12 pfennigs. In the form of the groschen, there were again coins that (occasionally) had a value of 12 pfennigs.

In northern Germany, from the High Middle Ages, the schilling was widely considered to be the sixteenth part of a Lübisch Mark and was divided into 12 pfennigs, as had been customary since the Carolingian coin reform. The German silver schillings of modern times were comparable to the groschen and continued to mostly be worth 12 pfennigs.

The abbreviation of the schilling is ß or ßl in many medieval and modern documents.

== Holy Roman Empire ==
=== Hamburg and Lübeck ===
From the Middle Ages, Hamburg and Lübeck based their currency on the Lübisch Mark of 16 schillings of 12 pfennigs each. In 1619, the Reichsthaler minted to the 9-Thaler standard was used as the Bank of Hamburg's stable-value account unit, the Bankothaler or Banco-Thaler. The Reichstaler then became the common basis of the mark and schilling currencies in Hamburg and Lübeck in 1622. From that year, the Reichsthaler was divided into exactly three Marks. In other words, from the amount of silver from which 9 thalers were struck, 27 marks could be minted.

In Hamburg between 1730 and 1764 around 110,000 Speciesthalers were minted to the 9-Thaler standard (fineness 888 ^{8}/_{9}; gross weight 29.2 g). On the Speciesthalers of 1761-1764 it is inscribed that there are also 48 schilling species. The naming of the schilling as a species coin was necessary because the silver content of the schillings of the Hamburger current currency introduced in 1725 was only about 5/6 of the schilling species. Hamburg also minted coins of 6, 12 and 24 schilling species on a small scale in 1762.

The background to the distinction between schilling species and schilling courant was the decision in 1725 to switch to a 34-mark standard. The schilling remained the main type of coin. The relationship 1 schilling = 12 pfennigs was easy to grasp at that time, since half a schilling was referred to as a sechsling ("sixer") and a quarter of a schilling as a dreiling ("three-er"). Individual pfennigs were not minted. The mark remained a pure unit of accountancy (the Zählmark). 1 schilling pieces were minted as Scheidemünzen and 2, 4, 8, 16 and 32 schilling pieces as currency coins. Schillings were struck in Hamburg until 1862.

Lübeck ceased minting coins after 1801 but continued to use the same currency system as Hamburg until German unification. By the time of the introduction of the German mark in 1873, Hamburg currency constituted 61% of the coins in circulation in Lübeck.

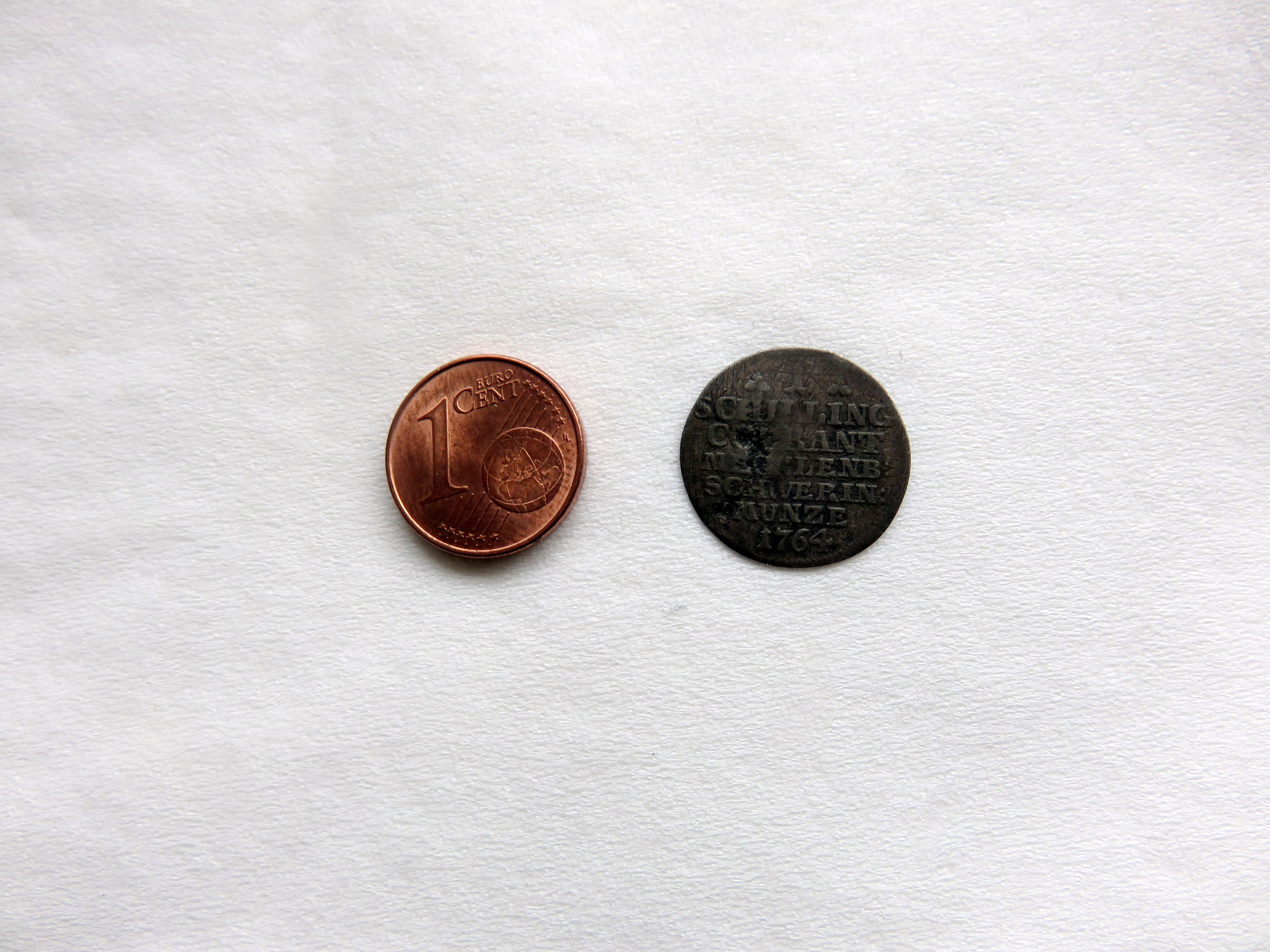
1 Schilling Courant, Mecklenburg-Schwerin, 1764 (size comparison)

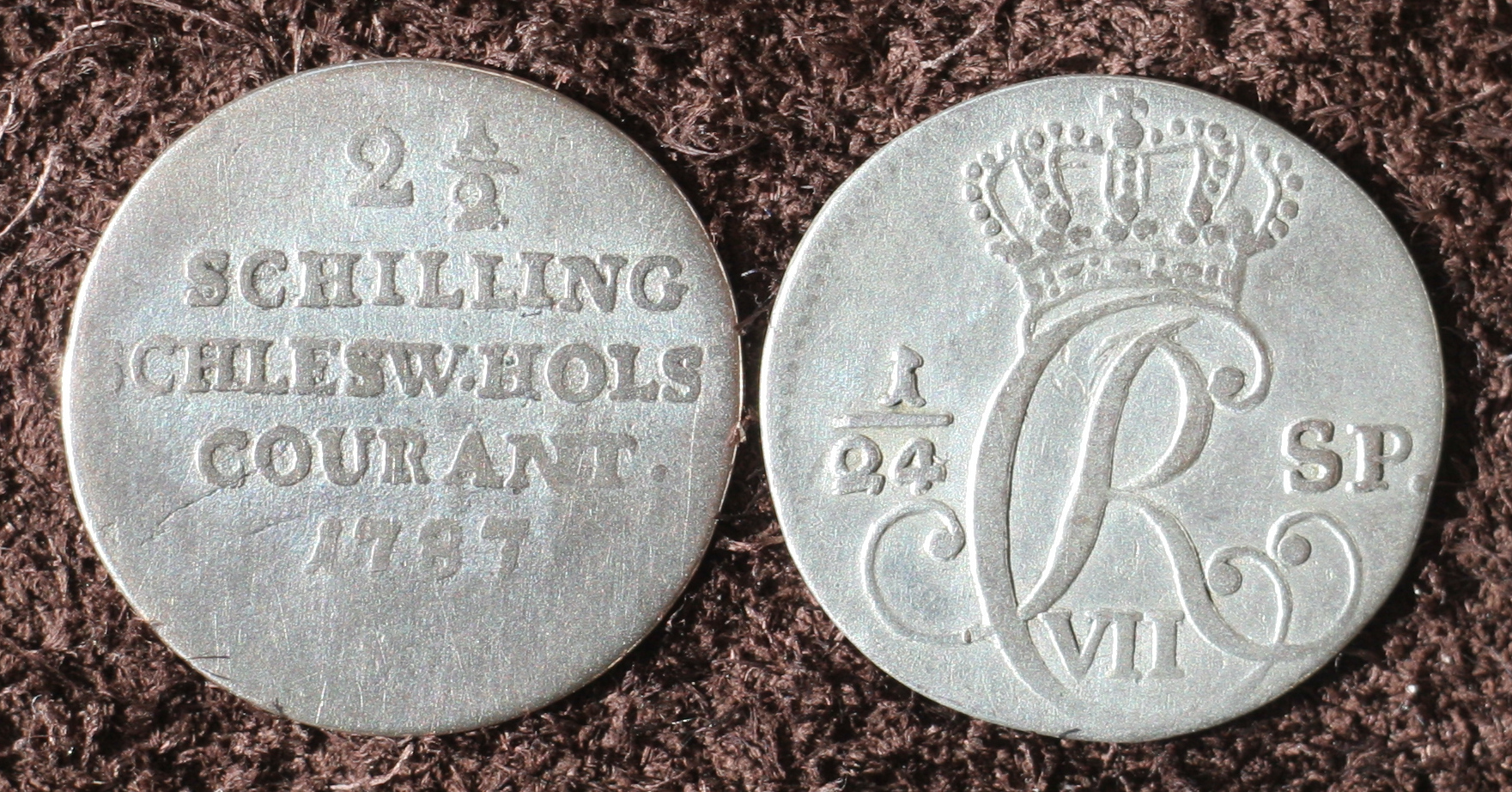
2 1/2 Schilling coin, Schleswig-Holstein, Courant, 1787

=== Mecklenburg ===
In Mecklenburg the schilling initially corresponded to the Lübeck and Hamburg schilling. From around 1325, however, 1 1/2 and later 2 Wendisch (i.e. Mecklenburg) schillings corresponded to 1 Lübeck schilling in; 2 1/2 Wendish schillings to 1 Brandenburg schilling. In the 16th and 17th centuries, 24 schillings equalled 1 gulden and, from the 17th century, 48 schillings made 1 thaler. This latter division of 1 thaler = 48 schillings each of 12 pfennigs applied in the two Mecklenburg states until the introduction of imperial currency in 1871, with the thaler then being counted as 3 new marks.

=== Württemberg ===
In Württemberg, schillings were struck into the 17th century. Early denominations were 6 1/2 schillings to 1 Nuremberg lot (1396), 7 to 1 Ulm lot (1404) and 10 to 1 lot of fine silver (1482, 1493, 1509).

=== Bavaria ===
In Bavaria in the late Middle Ages, a distinction was made between the 'short schilling valued at 12 pfennigs and the 'long schilling' valued at 30 pfennigs.

== Austria ==
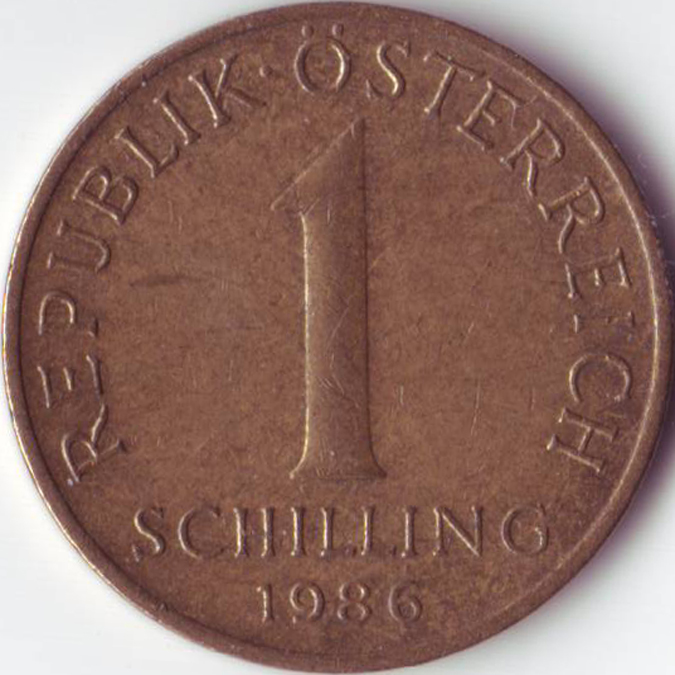
1 schilling coin, 1986

As in Bavaria, in mediaeval Austria there were short and long schillings valued at 12 and 30 pfennigs respectively. In the 19th century, the term schilling was still the equivalent of 30 pfennigs or 7½ kreuzers in the dialects of Salzburg and Upper Austria.

From 1925 to 1938 and 1945 to 1998 the schilling was an accounting unit as well as a currency, but from 1999 until the introduction of the euro in 2002, the schilling was only a currency unit. From 1938 to 1945, the Reichsmark was the basis of Austrian currency. The schilling coins and notes that were last in circulation can be exchanged at the Austrian National Bank for an unlimited period of time, but not the older series that have been withdrawn.

The schilling was also the name of the currency in the Wörgl currency experiment of 1932 and 1933.

== Scandinavia ==
The schilling or skilling from northern Germany made its way to Scandinavia.

=== Denmark ===
King Christopher III, born Prince of Palatinate-Neumarkt and King of Denmark from 1440 to 1448, had the first skillings struck in Denmark. The Danish skillings, of which there were 16 to the mark and 96 to the Danish thaler, were based on the Hamburg and Lübeck schillings. With fluctuating silver content, they remained an important Danish coin denomination until they were replaced in 1875 by the Danish krone at 100 Øre.

==== Schleswig and Holstein ====
The Schleswig-Holstein schilling courant was introduced in 1788 into the Duchies of Schleswig and Holstein, which were then part of the consolidated Danish state. The reference denomination was the Speciesthaler to the 9¼ thaler standard. 60 schillings courant made a Speciesthaler. Dreilings, sechslings and double sechsling coins were minted as Scheidemünzen and 2½ to 60 schilling coins as full currency coin at the latest until 1812.

The name of the coin is one of the few denominations in which the two separate duchies were connected with a hyphen, even before the term was politicized by 'Schleswig-Holsteinism' in the First Schleswig War.

=== Norway ===
In Norway, the Danish-Norwegian king John I introduced the schilling in the early 16th century. They were minted by the king in Bergen and by the Norwegian archbishop in Nidaros (Trondheim). At first the schilling was valued at 12 pfennigs. From 1628, the schilling was the smallest unit in the Norwegian monetary system: from 1635 to 1813, 96 schillings made 1 Reichstaler and, from 1813 to 1816, 1 Reichsbankthaler and, from 1816 to the introduction of the Norwegian krone in 1875, there were 120 schillings to 1 Norwegian speciedaler.

=== Sweden ===
In Sweden the schilling was introduced in 1776 as a coin of account; 1 Reichsthaler was made up of 48 schillings, each of 12 runstykke. Schillings were also minted from 1802 to 1855.

== Literature ==
- Bayerisches Wörterbuch by Johann Andreas Schmeller, Vol. II², col. 397–401, Schilling.
- Deutsches Rechtswörterbuch, Vol. XII, Sp. 641–648, Schilling.
- Lorenzo Fedel: "Schilling" in German, French and Italian in the online Historical Dictionary of Switzerland.
- Heinz Fengler, Gerhard Gierow, Willy Unger: transpress Lexikon. Numismatik (4th revised edn.). Transpress Verlag für Verkehrswesen, Berlin 1988 (ISBN 3-344-00220-1).
- Mecklenburgisches Wörterbuch, Vol. VII, Sp. 66–69, Schilling.
- Schwäbisches Wörterbuch, Vol. V, Sp. 837 f., Schilling.
- Schweizerisches Idiotikon, Vol. VIII, Sp. 574–597, Schilling.
- Young, John Parke (1925). European Currency and Finance. US Commission of Gold and Silver Inquiry.
