= Sechsling =

Coin

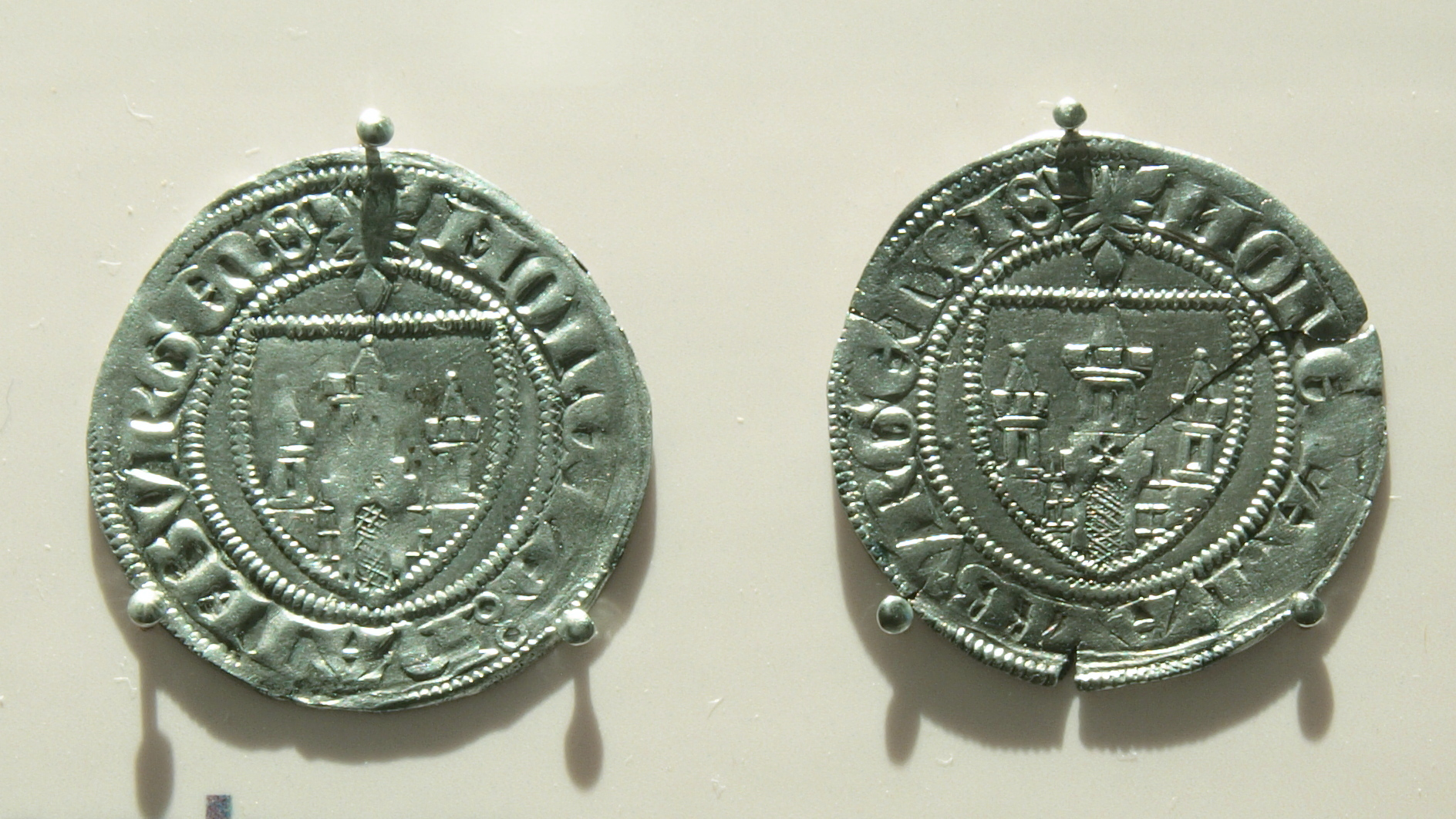
Medieval Sechsling, Hamburg, 1392

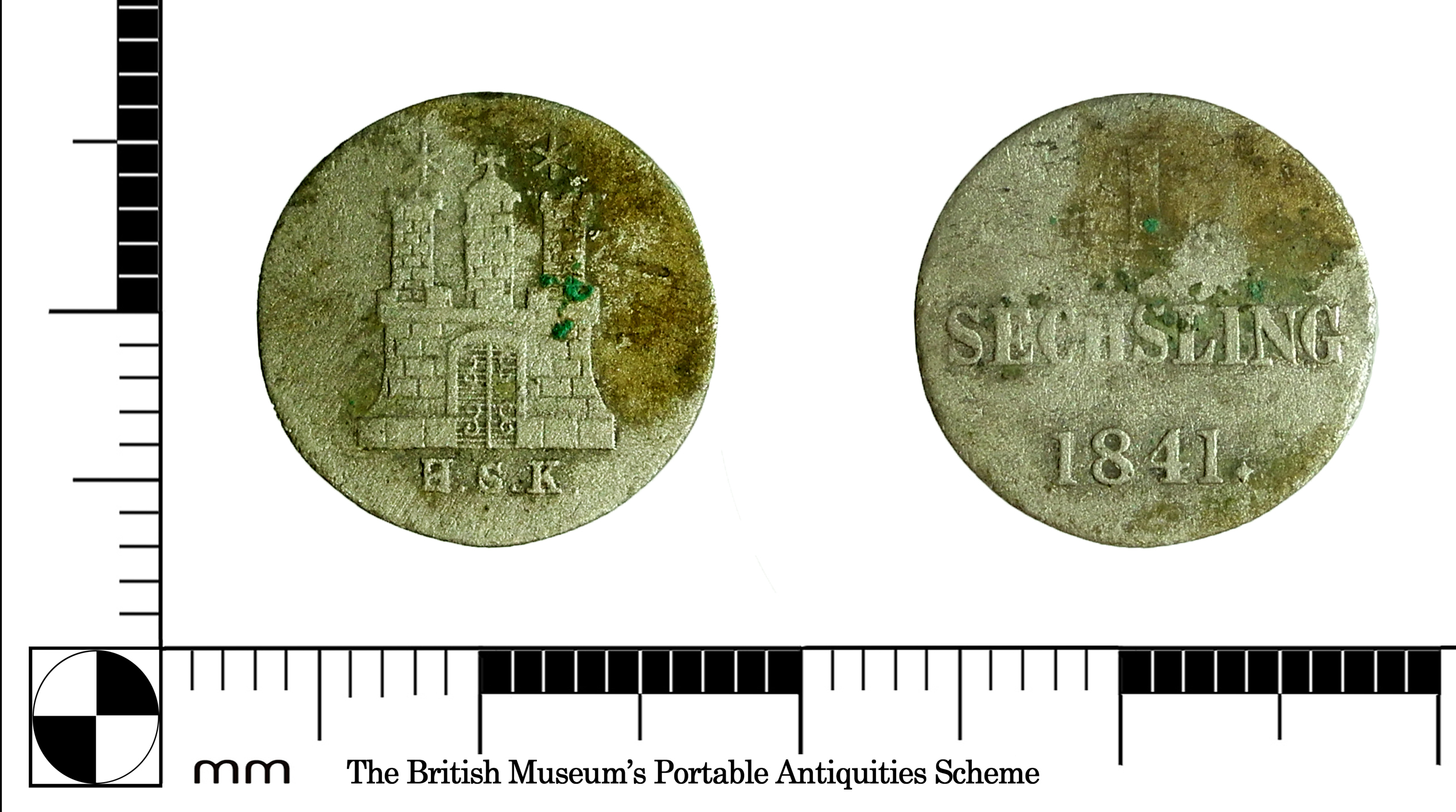
Sechsling, Hamburg, 1841

The Sechsling, also Sößling, Søsling (Dan./Norw.) or Sechser, was the name of a type of coin with a value of six Pfennigs, representing half a Groschen or half Schilling depending on the monetary system.

The Sechsling was first minted in 1388 by the city of Lübeck. With the treaty (Rezess) of 1392, the Sechsling became part of the monetary system within the Wendish Coinage Union and was thus a so-called 'Union coin' (Vereinsmünze). In addition to Lübeck, it was therefore issued by Hamburg, Lüneburg and Wismar. Other cities followed.

The Sechsling was minted until the dissolution of the Wendish Coinage Union after the middle of the 16th century. In the following imperial minting ordinance (Reichsmünzordnung), which was based on the Thaler, it was worth 1/60 Thaler. Hamburg minted the last Sechslings in 1855 from a billon alloy.

Deriving from the Prussian silver groschen (1/30 Thaler), after the introduction of the imperial Mark in 1871, the equivalent 10 Pfennig coin was popularly referred to in Germany as a Groschen. In the Berlin dialect, the term Sechser for half a Groschen was simply transferred to the 5 Pfennig coin; this designation is still occasionally heard in relation to the 5 euro cent coin. Colloquially, some bridges in Berlin are still called Sechser bridges (Sechserbrücke) because the toll for pedestrians was once 6 Pfennigs or 1/2 groschen.

== See also ==
- Roter Seufzer, a 6 pfennig piece from the Leipzig Mint
