= Currency money =

Currency containing its value in itself

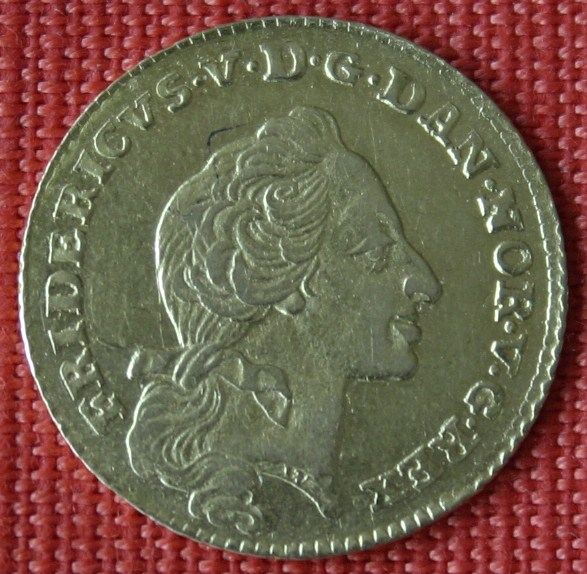

Currency money is money in full circulation that takes its value from the precious metal it contains, that is, its market value is (almost) the value of the metal it contains (apart from the Seigniorage or the minters' profit), though this is always overcompensated for in coins and banknotes from a country undergoing debasement. Currency money is usually made of silver or gold, but in very rare cases plated metal and even copper may be used. Currency or face value coins are a type of commodity money, money whose value is derived from the what it is or what it is made of (e.g. shell, cigarettes, tea or a certain metal) as opposed to coins whose metal value is less than their nominal value, paper money, and deposit or book money, which are fiat money.
