= Scheidemünze =

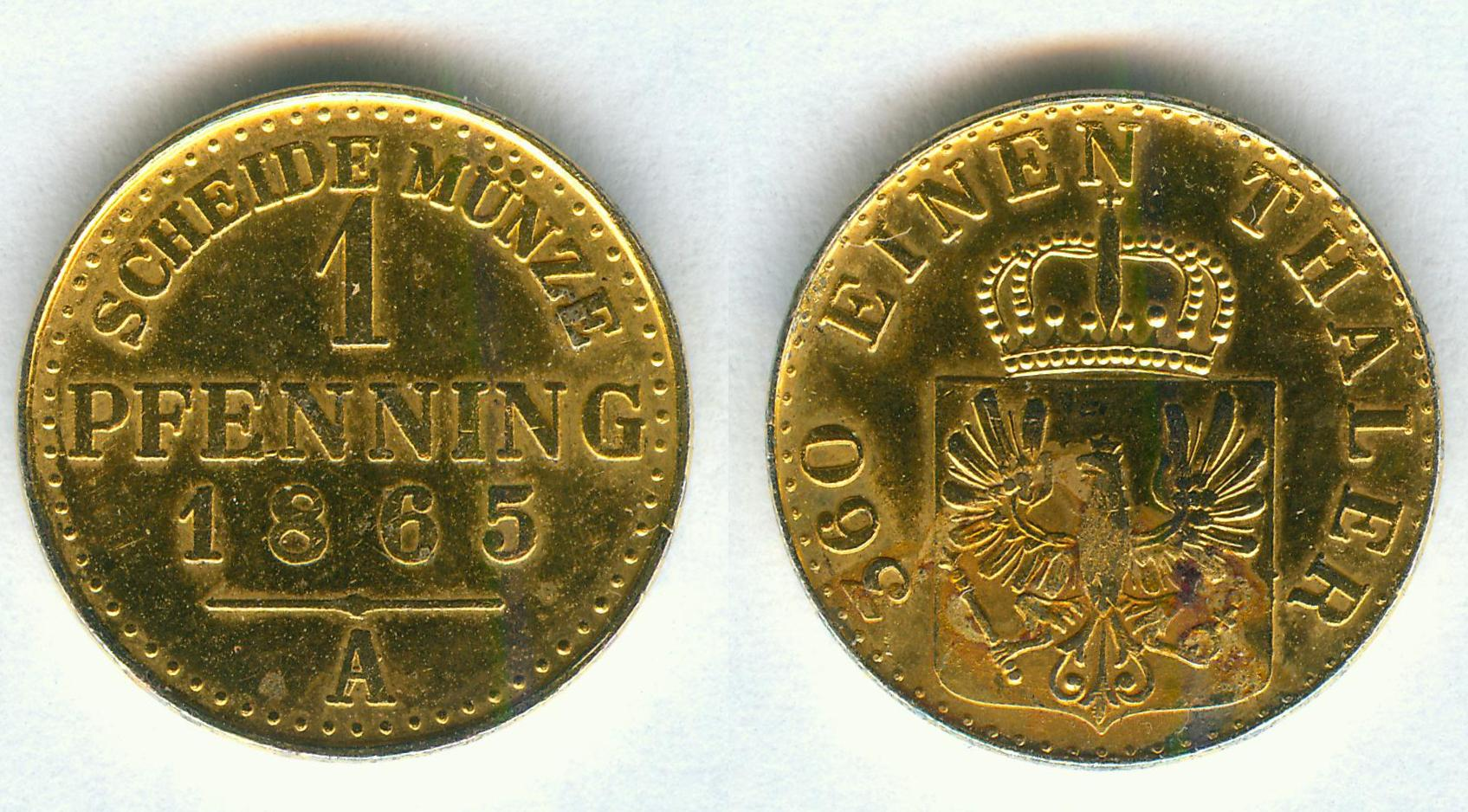
Scheidemünze 1 Pfenning, A

Scheidemünzen (singular – Scheidemünze) were representative coins or token coins issued alongside Kurantgeld or currency money in Austria and Germany up to start of the First World War in August 1914 whose intrinsic metal value was less than the legal value stamped on them. Like Notgeld ("emergency money") they were a kind of credit money or fiat money. The term Scheidemünze ("division money") referred to the "division into hellers and pfennigs during the purchase process" ("Scheiden auf Heller und Pfennig beim Kaufvorgang"). It thus applied to the low- to medium-value coins and is often translated as small change coin, small-coin change or just small coin. Since 1915, all coins minted in Germany, including the current euro coins have been Scheidemünzen or fiat money as opposed to currency or commodity money whose nominal value is fully covered by its intrinsic value.

== Bibliography ==
- Heinz Fengler: transpress Lexikon Numismatik, Verlag für Verkehrswesen Berlin 1988, ISBN 3-344-00220-1
- Verein Gelehrter und praktischer Kaufleute: Handels-Lexikon oder Encyclopädie der gesamten Handelswissenschaften für Kaufleute und Fabrikanten, Verlag Ernst Schäfer, 1847, Leipzig
- Rudolf Hilferding: Das Finanzkapital, Verlag JHW Dietz Nachfolger GmbH Berlin 1947 (unveränderter Nachdruck von 1910)
- C. Schaeffer, Dr. H. Brode: Allgemeine Volkswirtschaftslehre, Verlag C. L. Hirschfeld, Leipzig 1927
