= Thai baht =

Currency of Thailand

บาทไทย (Thai)
- Banknotes and coins of the Thai baht issued by the Bank of Thailand (15th series)

ISO 4217
- Code: THB (numeric: 764)
- Subunit: 0.01

Units of account
- Plural: The language(s) of this currency do(es) not have a morphological plural distinction.
- Symbol: ฿ or บ
- Subunit
- 1/100: satang

Denominations
- Banknotes: ฿20, ฿50, ฿100, ฿500, ฿1000
- Coins
- Freq. used: 25, 50 satang, ฿1, ฿2, ฿5, ฿10
- Rarely used: 1, 5, 10 satang (internal use in banks; not in circulation)

Demographics
- Date of introduction: 1897; 129 years ago
- Official user(s): Thailand
- Unofficial users: Cambodia; Laos; Myanmar; Vietnam

Issuance
- Central bank: Bank of Thailand
- Website: www.bot.or.th
- Printer: Note Printing Works of the Bank of Thailand
- Mint: Royal Thai Mint
- Website: www.royalthaimint.net

Valuation
- Inflation: 1.2% (2023)
- Source: World Bank
- Pegged with: Spanish dollar: 1856–1880; Pound sterling: 1880–1942; Japanese yen: 1942–1945; United States dollar: 1956–1997; Free floating: 1997–present

The baht (/bɑːt/; Thai: บาท, pronounced [bàːt̚]; sign: ฿ or บ.; code: THB) is the official currency of Thailand. It is divided into 100 satang (สตางค์, pronounced [sà.tāːŋ]; sign: st. or สต.). The currency was officially adopted during the Sukhothai period (1238–1438 CE) and continuously issued since. Initially issued in the podduang form, King Rama IV decided to switch to flat coins in 1860. The baht was then decimalised in 1897, before which the baht was divided into 8 fueang (เฟื้อง, pronounced [fɯá̯ŋ]), each into 8 at (อัฐ, pronounced [ʔàt̚]), and each into 100 bia (เบี้ย, pronounced [bîa]). The issuance of currency is the responsibility of the Bank of Thailand. SWIFT ranked the Thai baht as the 10th-most-frequently used world payment currency as of December 2023.

The baht was defined as 15.16 grams (0.4874 troy oz) of silver or gold, which was exchanged at 16:1 ratio. This was the case until the decree of June 29, 1874 which switched the Thai baht to the silver standard, and again in 1908, converting the baht to the gold standard before being completely debased in 1962 with the halt in production of the silver baht coin.

The baht was pegged to the Spanish dollar from 1856 at a ฿5 to $3 ratio. It was then pegged to the British pound sterling (£) at a ฿8 to £1 in 1880 and subsequently several re-pegging to a new ratio. The baht was then pegged to the US dollar at a ฿20 to US$1 ratio along with several re-peg. The baht was forced to float in 1997 causing the Asian financial crisis.

== History ==
Coins in Circulation

Siamese tical (Predecimal Thai baht)
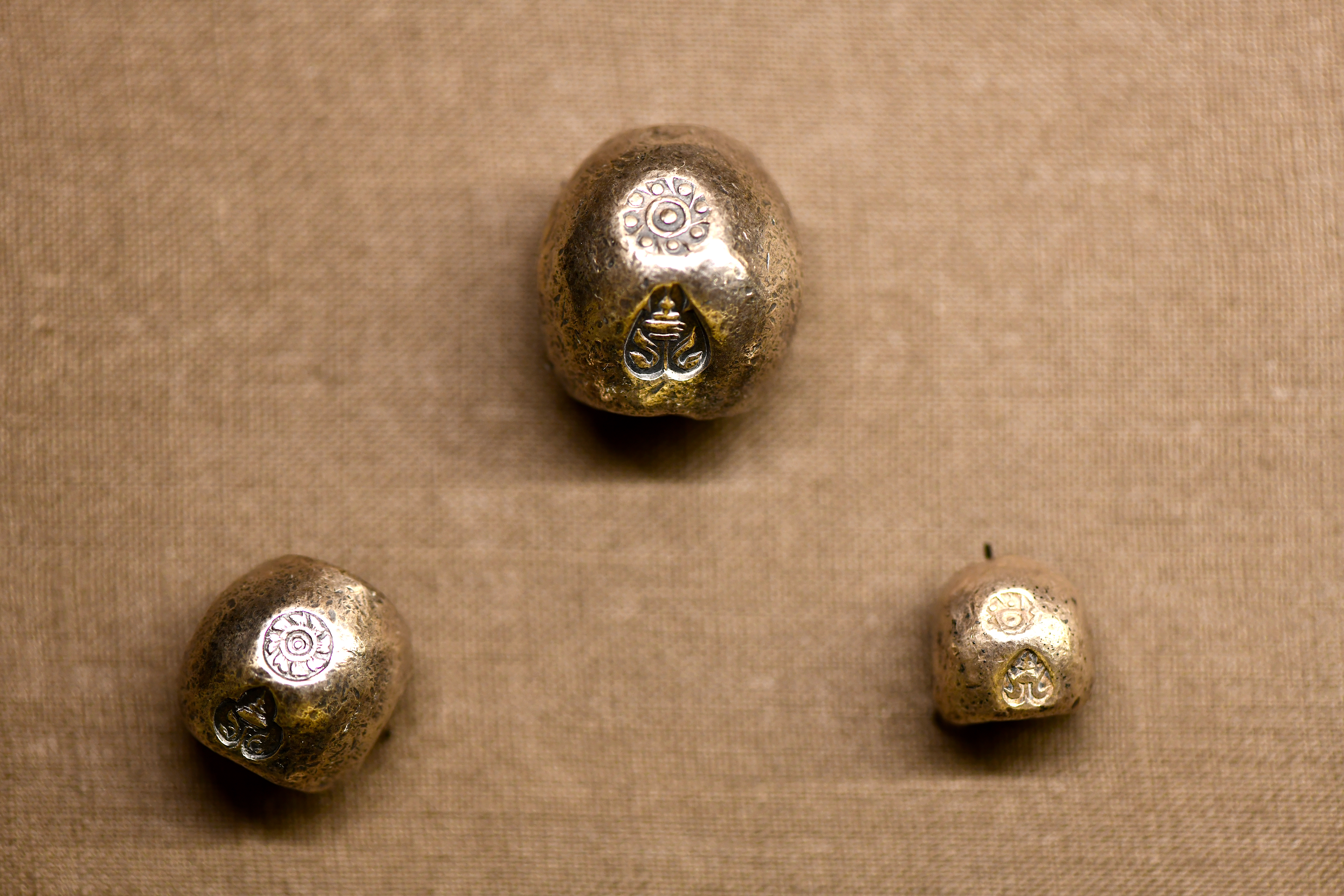
Predecimal bullet coin issued by Rama III
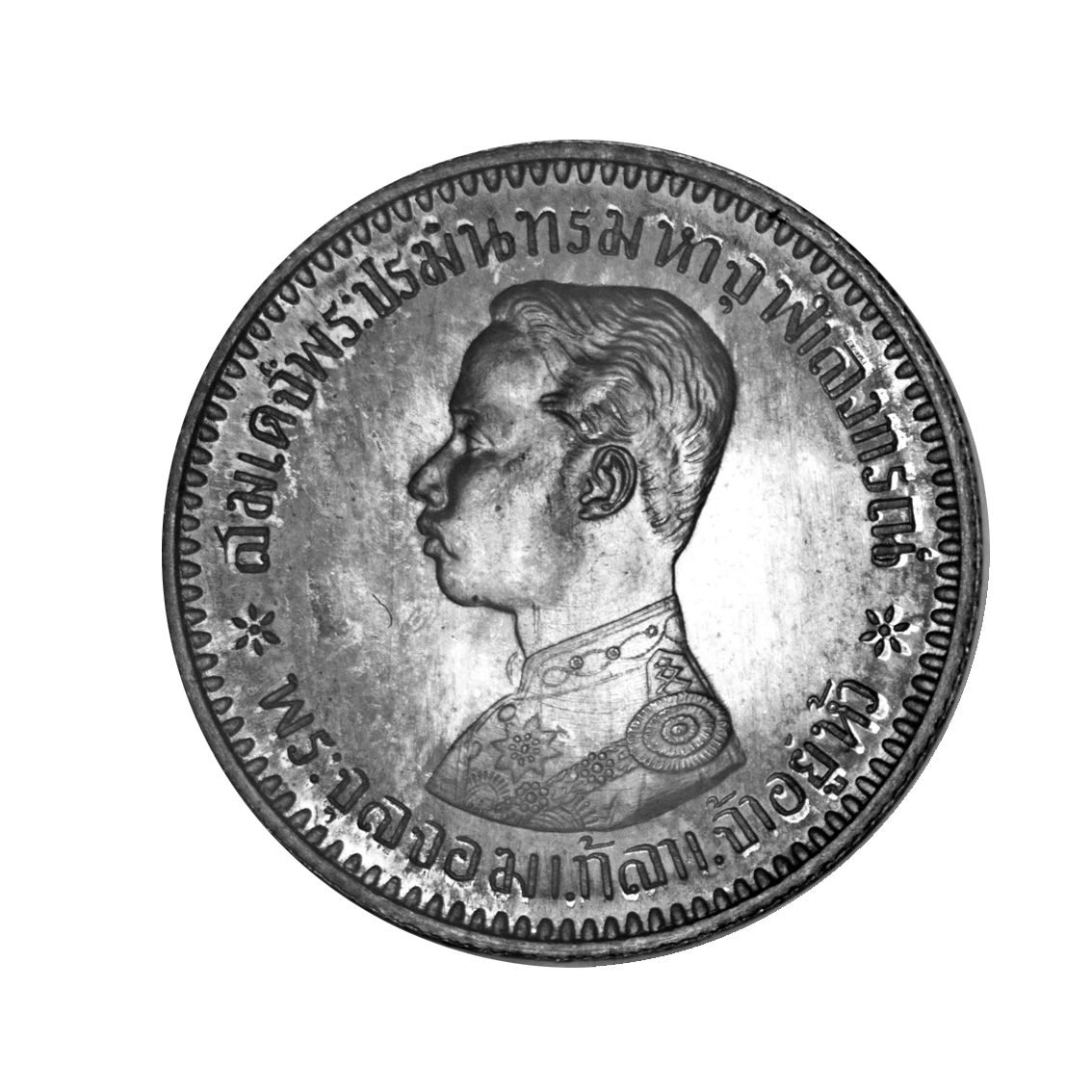
Predecimal tical coin issued by Rama V

Units of account
- Plural: ticals (baht)
- Symbol: None official. The abbreviations Tcs, Tcl, 圓, or 銖 were used.
- Superunit
- 80: chang
- 4: tamlueng
- Subunit
- 1/8: fueang
- 1/64: at
- Symbol
- fueang: F or 方

Denominations
- Banknotes
- Freq. used: 1 Tcs; 5 Tcs
- Rarely used: 1/8 Tcs; 1/4 Tcs; 3/8 Tcs; 1/2 Tcs; 5/8 Tcs; 3/4 Tcs; 7/8 Tcs; 8 Tcs; 10 Tcs; 12 Tcs; 16 Tcs; 20 Tcs; 24 Tcs; 28 Tcs; 32 Tcs; 40 Tcs; 48 Tcs; 60 Tcs; 80 Tcs; 100 Tcs; 140 Tcs; 400 Tcs; 800 Tcs; 1000 Tcs
- Coins
- Freq. used: 1/16 F, 1/8 F, 1/4 F, 1/2 F, 1 F, 1/4 Tcs, 1/2 Tcs, 1 Tcs, 1/2 Tm, 1 Tm, 2 1/2 Tcs, 4 Tcs, 8 Tcs

Demographics
- Date of introduction: 1238; 788 years ago
- Date of withdrawal: 1910; 116 years ago
- User(s): Siam

Issuance
- Central bank: Siamese government
- Printer: see § Predecimal banknotes
- Mint: Royal Thai Mint

Valuation
- Pegged with: Pound sterling (from 1908) (13 baht per £)
- This infobox shows the latest status before this currency was rendered obsolete.

The Thai baht, like the pound, originated from a traditional unit of mass. Its currency value was originally expressed as that of silver of corresponding weight (now defined as 15 grams), and was in use probably as early as the Sukhothai period in the form of bullet coins known in Thai as photduang. These were pieces of solid silver cast to various weights corresponding to a traditional system of units related by simple fractions and multiples, one of which is the baht. These are listed in the following table: Though the coins themselves have names like: solot, siao, sik, etc., the formal division of the Thai baht (tical) is 1 baht = 8 fueang = 64 at. This means that one baht is divided into eight fueang, and each one fueang is divided into eight at. Currently, the Thai baht do not employ the at as a subunit, but the at is the current subunit of the Lao kip.

=== Denominations ===
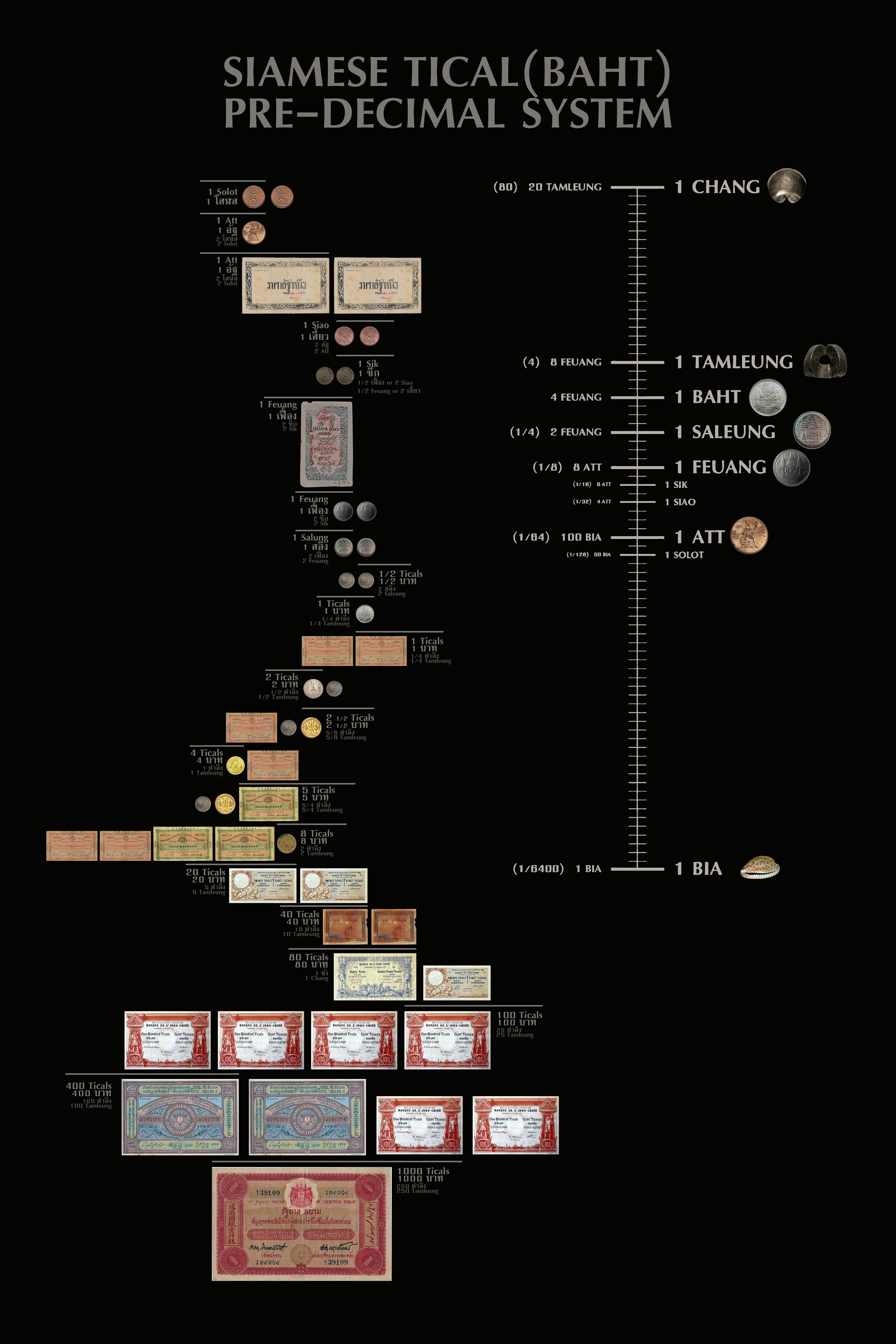
Siamese predecimal tical system

| Unit | Example | Value relative to | | Notes |
| Unit | Example | Baht | Satang | Notes |
|---|---|---|---|---|
| Bia เบี้ย | | 1/6400 | 0.0156 | Bia is Thai for cowry, the shell of which was used as a trade medium of the same value. The value fluctuates anywhere from 1 at = 60 to 1 at = 1200 depending on the era |
| Solot โสฬส | | 1/128 | 0.78 | Solot here literally means sixteen or sixteenth, referring to the fractional amount relative to a fueang. |
| Satang สตางค์ | | 1/100 | 1.00 | Means a hundredth of a cash |
| At อัฐ | | 1/64 | 1.56 | Likewise, at means eight. |
| Siao/Phai เสี้ยว/เสี้ยว/ไพ | | 1/32 | 3.125 | Siao means quarter. |
| Sik ซีก/สิ้ก | | 1/16 | 6.25 | Sik means half. |
| Fueang เฟื้อง | | 1/8 | 12.5 | The smallest silver bullet coins available in the market. |
| Salueng สลึง | | 1/4 | 25 | Thai version of the mace. It is also the equivalent of the Cambodian salong, and Burmese pya. |
| Baht บาท | | 1 | 100 | It is also the equivalent of the Cambodian baat, and Burmese kyat. Its alternative name is the tical. |
| Tamlueng ตำลึง | | 4 | 400 | Thai version of the tael. |
| Chang ชั่ง | | 80 | 8000 | Thai version of the catty. |
| Hap หาบ | no example | 6400 | 640000 | |

This predecimal system was in use up until 1897, when the decimal system devised by Prince Jayanta Mongkol, in which one baht = 100 satang, was introduced by his half-brother King Chulalongkorn along with the demonetisation of silver bullet coins on 28 October 1904 after the end of silver bullet coin production by the opening of Sitthikarn Royal Mint in 1857. However, coins denominated in the old units were issued until 1910, and the amount of 25 satang is still commonly referred to as a salueng, as is the 25-satang coin.

Until 27 November 1902, the baht was fixed on a purely silver basis, with 15 grams of silver to the baht. This caused the value of the currency to vary relative to currencies on a gold standard. From 1856 to 1864, the values of certain foreign silver coins were fixed by law, with 5 baht = 3 Spanish dollar = 7 Indian rupees. Before 1880 the exchange rate was fixed at 8 baht per £, falling to 10 to the £ during the 1880s.

In 1902, the government began to increase the value of the baht by following all increases in the value of silver against gold but not reducing it when the silver price fell. Beginning at 21.75 baht per British £, the currency rose in value until, in 1908, a fixed peg to the British pound sterling was established of 13 baht per £. This was revised to 12 baht in 1919 and then, after a period of instability, to 11 baht in 1923. During World War II, the baht was fixed at a value of one Japanese yen on 22 April 1942.

From 1956 until 1973, the baht was pegged to the US dollar at an exchange rate of 20.8 baht = one US$ and at 20 baht = 1 US$ until 1978. A strengthening US economy caused Thailand to re-peg its currency at 25 to the US$ from 1984 until 2 July 1997, when the country was affected by the 1997 Asian financial crisis. The baht was floated and halved in value, reaching its lowest rate of 56 to the US$ in January 1998. It rose to 30 per US$ in January 2021.

The baht was originally known to foreigners by the term tical, which was used in English language text on banknotes until the series 2 1925.

=== Currency sub-unit equivalents ===
| Thai Equiv. Subunits | Thailand (Siam) | India (British India) | Roman Currency (c. 0AD) | Myanmar (Konbaung) | British pound | US dollar | Cambodia | Laos (Lan Xang & etc.) | Indochinese Union | Vietnam (Nguyen) | China (Qing) | Korea (Joseon) | Japan (Tokugawa) |
|---|---|---|---|---|---|---|---|---|---|---|---|---|---|
| 4 Unit | Tamlung (55g~ silver) | | | | Half-Sovereign (10s) (54g~ silver) | | Taal (60g~silver) | Lat (60g~ silver) | | | | | Kanmon (56g~ silver) |
| 2 1/2 Unit | Paddung (35g~ silver) | | | | | | Tael (34g~ silver) | | | Chỉ (10錢/1兩) (37g~ silver) | Tael (10錢/1两) (37g~ silver) | Nyang (100錢/1兩) (37g~ silver) | Ryo (~12朱/1両) (37g~ silver) |
| 2 Unit | Half-Tamlung (27g~ silver) | | | | Crown (5s) (27g~ silver) | US dollar ($1) (24g~ silver) | Piastre (27g~ silver) | | | Nguyên (1元) (27g~ silver) | Yuan (1元) (27g~ silver) | Won (1圓) (27g~ silver) | Yen (1圓) (27g~ silver) |
| 1 Unit | Baht (14g~ silver) | Rupee (12g~ silver) | | Kyat (12g~ silver) | Half-Crown (2½s) (13g~ silver) | Half-US dollar ($½) (12g~ silver) | Baat (15g~silver) | | | | | | |
| 1/2 Unit | Two Salung (6.9g~ silver) | Athanni (6g~ silver) | | | Shilling (1s) (5g~ silver) | Quarter ($1/4) (6g~ silver) | | | | | | | Bu (~3朱) (8.5g~ silver) |
| 1/4 Unit | Salung (3.4g~ silver) | Chawanni (3g~ silver) | Denarius (4g~ silver) | Mat (3g~ silver) | Sixpence (6d) (2.5g~ silver) | Dime (10¢) (2.3g~ silver) | Salong | | | Tiền (1錢) (3.7g~ silver) | Mace (1錢) (3.7g~ silver) | Yang (1/5圓) (3.7g~ silver) | Shu (1朱) (2.6g~ silver) |
| 1/8 Unit | Fuang (1.7g~ silver) | Duanni (1.5g~ silver) | Quinarius (2g~ silver) | Mu (1.5g~ silver) | Threepence (3d) (1.3g~ silver) | Nickel (5¢) (1.2g~ silver) | Fuang | | | | | | |
| 1/16 Unit | Sik (0.85g~ silver) | Anna (0.75g~ silver) | Sestertius (1g~ silver) | Pe (0.75g~ silver) | | | | | | | | | |
| 1/32 Unit | Pai / Siao (0.42g~ silver) | Taka (0.38g~ silver) | Dupondius (0.5g~ silver) | | Penny (1d) (0.43g~ silver) | | Pe | | | | | | |
| 1/40 Unit | | | | | | | | | | Phân (1/10錢) (0.37g~ silver) | Candareen (1/10錢) (0.37g~ silver) | Jeon (1錢) (0.37g~ silver) | |
| 1/64 Unit | At (0.21g~ silver) | Pice (0.18g~ silver) | As (0.25g~ silver) | Pya | Halfpenny (½d) (0.21g~ silver) | Penny (1¢) (0.2g~ silver) | At | At (old) | | | | | |
| 1/100 Unit | Satang (0.13g~silver) | (new) Paisa | | (new) Pyas | | | Sen | Cent / At | Cent | (new) Văn (1/100元) | (new) Fen (1/100元) | (new) Jeon (1/100圓) | (new) Sen (1/100圓) |
| 1/128 Unit | Solot (0.11g~silver) | | Semis (0.1g~ silver) | | Farthing (1/4d) (0.11g~ silver) | | | | | | | | |
| 1/256 Unit | | Pie | | | Half-Farthing (1/8d) (0.05g~ silver) | | | | | | | | |
| 1/400 Unit | Bia | | | | | | Sapèque | | | Văn (1/100錢) | Cash / Fen (1/100錢) (0.037g~ silver) | Pun / Mun (1/10錢) | Mon (~1/333朱) |
*Silver or silver equivalents; ** Weights for the baht is based upon the 1908 weight standard

== On the topic of demonetization ==
Unlike many nations that periodically demonetize obsolete currency series to combat counterfeiting or financial crimes, Thailand maintains a policy of perpetual legal tender status for its paper currency. Under national monetary frameworks, all banknotes officially issued by the government since the central bank's establishment remain legally valid for circulation and exchange at face value. Though this is done through omission as per the Currency Act B.E. 2501.

While older paper issues theoretically retain full purchasing power, their modern everyday use is virtually non-existent. This is due to a lack of public familiarity, compatibility limitations with modern automated banking systems, and the fact that their collector value often vastly exceeds face value. However, any obsolete or heavily worn banknote can still be exchanged for modern equivalents at any commercial bank or directly at the BOT without an expiration date.

=== Precedents for demonetization ===
There are only one occurrence for demonetization of a series. The first time is when the currency transferred to the decimal system, eliminating denomination such as at, fuang, and etc. This occurred through a bunch of decrees from 1895 to 1909 when the old currency was phased out.

== Currency symbol ==
The currency symbol for the baht is ฿ (a Latin letter B with a vertical stroke). In 1986, this symbol was given a codepoint for computer use in the Thai Industrial Standard 620–2533 (Thailand's extension of ASCII), at position 0xDF. This national standard was subsequently subsumed into international standards as ISO/IEC 8859-11 ("ISO Latin-Thai"). In turn, the ISO 8859 series were transposed into the Unicode standard, where the symbol was allocated the codepoint U+0E3F ฿ THAI CURRENCY SYMBOL BAHT. The symbol is also used for the Panamanian balboa.

=== Abbreviation ===
In Thai usage, the baht (บาท) is legally abbreviated as บ. according to Section 7 of the Currency Act, B.E. 2501 (1958).

=== Bitcoin ===
For a time, the baht symbol was appropriated by some as a symbol for Bitcoin, a cryptocurrency. Following representations, a separate code point (U+20BF ₿ BITCOIN SIGN, a Latin letter B with two vertical strokes) was allocated in Unicode version 10.0.

=== Square katakana ===
In Unicode 1.0, two codepoints were allocated to the baht, one as the currency symbol in the Thai range and one in the CJK Compatibility block as a square version of the Japanese word for "baht", written in katakana script. The CJK codepoint, U+332C ㌬ SQUARE PAATU, is documented in subsequent versions of the standard as "a mistaken, unused representation" and users are directed to U+0E3F ฿ THAI CURRENCY SYMBOL BAHT instead. Consequently, only a few computer fonts have any content for this codepoint and its use is deprecated.

(The Japanese for "baht" is バーツ (bātsu). However, the reference glyph ⟨㌬⟩ and the character name correspond to パーツ (pātsu, from English "parts").)

=== Historical symbols used before decimalisation ===
Before decimalisation, the Siamese government employed Chinese, Latin, Jawi (Malay), Devanagari, Khmer and Khom, Lanna, and Burmese scripts in banknotes and coins, as seen. The reason is not clear, though it is a common understanding that it is to ease the facilicitation of trade within Siam. It could also be the case that at the time, the capital, Bangkok (Phra Nakhon) was still a multi-cultural city, so as to be more inclusive, the government added various other language onto the currency – though by the second series after the decimalisation in the 1900s, the currency was all but monolingual.

圓; yuán (บาท): This character was use during the times of Rama IV to represent ticals, though this was phased out by another character which is in partially and informally used today. The only occurrence of this character was in Rama IV's banknote series.

銖; 铢; zhū (บาท): This character was in use from 1868 to 1925 officially on banknotes to represent ticals. It is still in use today unofficially to refer to the Thai baht in general, as in 泰銖 or 泰铢.

錢; 銭; qián (สลึง): This character was in use from 1851 to 1908 officially on banknotes and coins to represent salueng.

方; fāng (เฟื้อง): This character was in use from 1851 to 1908 officially on banknotes and coins to represent fueang.

The notation for these Chinese character are written like they are in Thai, though there is a caveat: it is written right to left, as was the convention back then, so one tical is written 圓壹 or 銖壹, if there are smaller units involved the notation can write like such: 方銭參圓壹 for one tical, three salueng, and one fueang.

== Coins ==
=== Summary ===
History

Podduang Coinage
| Series/Value | 1/800 Fueang (1 Bia) | 1/8 Fueang (1 At) | 1/4 Fueang (1 Siao) | 1/2 Fueang (1 Sik) | 1 Fueang (1 Fueang) | 1/4 Ticals (1 Salueng) | 1/2 Ticals (2 Salueng) | 1 Tical (1 Baht) | 2 Ticals (2 Baht) | 4 Ticals (1 Tamlueng) | 8 Ticals (2 Tamlueng) | goes up to 80 ticals (1 Chang) |
|---|---|---|---|---|---|---|---|---|---|---|---|---|
| (1238–1900) 662 years | | | | | | | | | | | | goes up to 80 ticals (1 Chang) |
Predecimal Coins [ 1 baht = 64 at ]
| Series/Value | 1/16 Fueang (1 Solot) | 1/8 Fueang (1 At) | 1/4 Fueang (1 Siao) | 1/2 Fueang (1 Sik) | 1 Fueang (1 Fueang) | 1/4 Ticals (1 Salueng) | 1/2 Ticals (2 Salueng) | 1 Tical (1 Baht) | 2 Ticals (2 Baht) | 2 1/2 Ticals (2 Baht 2 Salueng) | 4 Ticals (1 Tamlueng) | 8 Ticals (2 Tamlueng) |
| Issue 1 (1856) 4 years | | | | | | | | | | | | |
| Issue 2 (1860) 9 years | | | | | | | | | | | | |
| Issue 3 (1869) 6 years | | | | | | | | | | | | |
| Issue 4 (1875) 13 years | | | | | | | | | | | | |
| Issue 5 (1888–1908) 20 years | | | | | | | | | | | | |
Decimal Coins [ 1 baht = 100 satang ]
| Series/Value | 0.5 Satang | 1 Satang | 2.5 Satang | 5 Satang | 10 Satang | 20 Satang | 25 Satang | 50 Satang | 1 Baht | 2 Baht | 5 Baht | 10 Baht |
| Issue 6 (1897) 11 years | | | | | | | | | | | | |
| Issue 7 (1908, 1939) Rama V* 5 years | | | | | | | | | | | | |
| Issue 8 (1913) Rama VI* 16 years | | | | | | | | | | | | |
| Issue 9 (1929) Rama VII* 8 years | | | | | | | | | | | | |
| Issue 10 (1937, 1941, 1942, 1945) 9 years | | | | | | | | | | | | |
| Issue 11 (1946) 4 years | | | | | | | | | | | | |
| Issue 12 (1950) 22 years | | | | | | | | | | | | |
| Issue 13 (1972) 5 years | | | | | | | | | | | | |

*actual year produced vs year in active use

==== Events ====
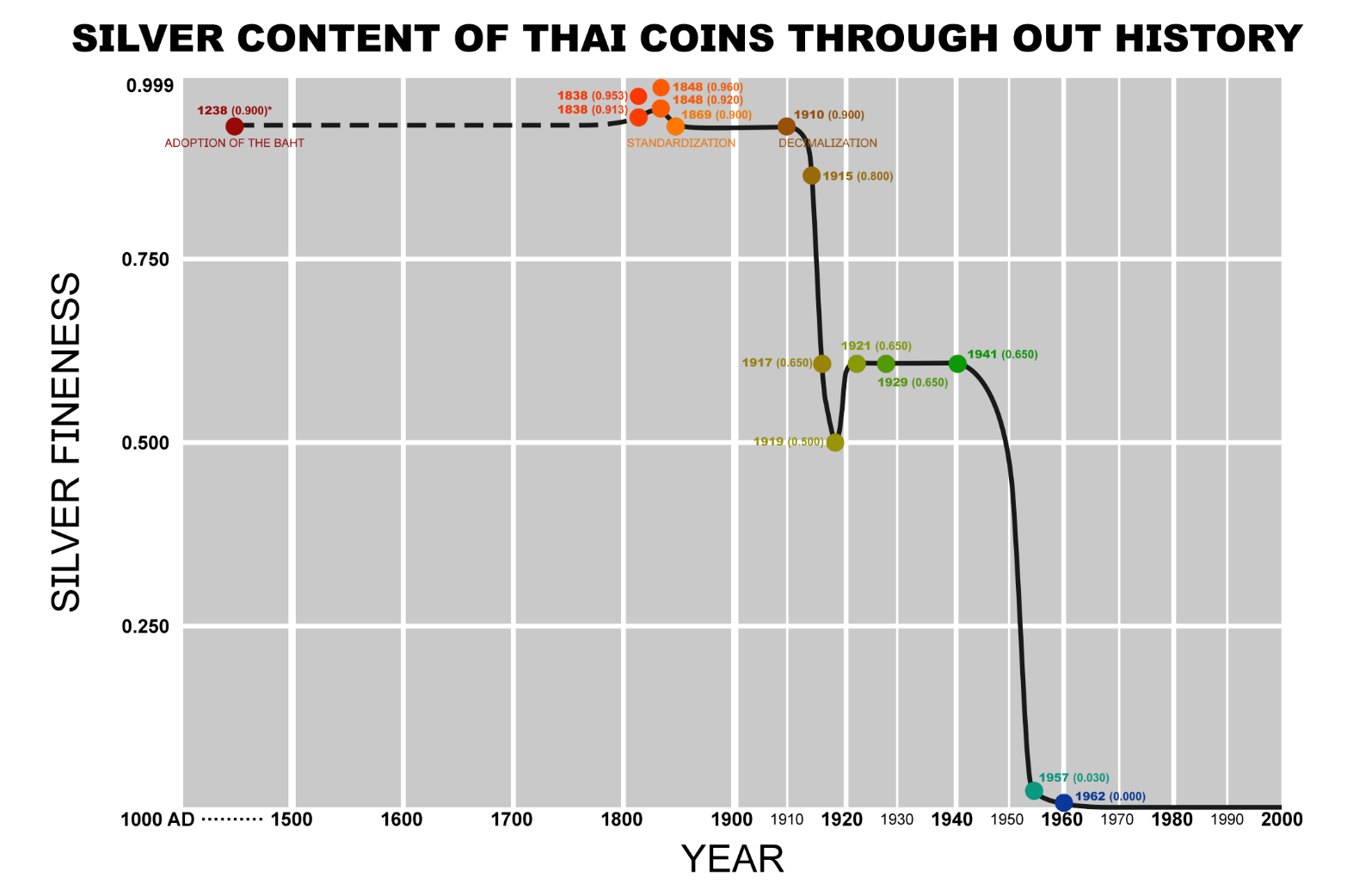

- [Adoption of bimetallic standard] 1238 – The baht was adopted as the national currency in the forms of Podduang. The currency used the bi-metallic standard at 1:16 gold to silver ratio.
- 1500 – Modern pre-decimal denominations of the baht were fully in use, mainly: 1 att, 2 att, 4 att, 1 fuang, 2 fuang, 4 fuang, and 1 baht.
- 1835 – Government moved toward the adoption of flat coins
- 1852 – The first circulating banknotes were introduced
- 1862 – The first circulating flat coins were introduced
- 1869 – Adoption of 0.900 fineness standard for silver coins, prior to this, the mint used the "best silver available".
- [Adoption of silver standard] 1875 – The production of all coins above the 1 baht value and all gold coins was halted
- 1897 – Government started the process of decimalisation, the introduction of 2.5 satang, 5 satang, 10 satang, and 20 satang coins. These coins co-circulated with the pre-decimal coins
- 1904 – Demonetisation of the Podduang,
- [Adoption of gold standard] 1908 – Introduction of the 1 satang, 25 satang, abd 50 satang coins. The production of the 2.5-satang coins was halted. 1 baht coin is now 15g, and made of 13.7g silver at 0.900 purity.
- [Decimalisation] 1910 – Government finished the process of decimalisation, all non-decimal currency, including banknotes and coins, were demonetised. The new series of coins; consisting of 1 satang, 5 satang, 10 satang, 25 satang, 50 satang, and 1 baht coin; was introduced.
- [Silver crisis] 1915 – Debasement of silver standard to 0.800 fineness, worldwide silver price crisis starting a global trend towards fiat currency.
- 1916 – Debasement of silver standard to 0.650 fineness
- 1918 – Removal of 1 baht from circulation, silver became too expensive to use in coins - doubling in value.
- 1919 – Debasement of silver standard to 0.500 fineness
- 1920 – Re-establishment of silver standard to 0.650 fineness, coinciding with the lowering of silver price
- 1945 – De facto move towards fiat currency and the abandonment of the silver standard due to coins no longer being made from silver.
- 1946 – Removal of 20 satang from circulation
- 1950 – Removal of 1 satang from circulation
- 1957 – Debasement of silver standard to 0.030 fineness, re-introduction of the 1 silver baht coin
- [Debasement] 1962 – Adoption of the fiat currency, and the abandonment of the silver standard. Due to this, the production of the last silver coin (1 baht) was halted.
- 1972 – Introduction of 5 baht coin.
- 1977 – Removal of 5 satang and 10 satang from circulation.
- 1987 – Introduction of 10 baht coin
- 2005 – Re-introduction of 2 baht coin

=== Mint involved in producing Siamese and Thai coins ===
Mints
| Name of the production facility | Alternative names | Start | End |
|---|---|---|---|
| Royal Thai Mint | สำนักกษาปณ์ | 1860 | present |
| China Banknote Printing and Minting Corporation | 中国印钞造币总公司 | 2017 | 2017 |
| Korea Minting and Security Printing Corporation | 한국조폐공사 | 2017 | present |
| South African Mint | | 2016 | present |
| Mint of Bavaria | Bayerisches Münzkontor | 2011 | 2016 |
| Mint of Finland | Suomen Rahapaja | 1986 | 2017 |
| Mint of Poland | Mennica Polska | 2015 | 2016 |
| Mint of Paris | Monnaie de Paris | 1908 2017 | 1925 2017 |
| Royal Canadian Mint | Monnaie Royale Canadienne | 1986 | 2007 |
| State Mint and Polygraphic Institute (Italian Mint) | Istituto Poligrafico e Zecca dello Stato | 1989 | 1989 |
| Mint of Japan | 独立行政法人造幣局 | 1926 | 1937 |
| Heaton and Sons (Birmingham Mint Limited) | | 1875 | 1921 |
| Royal Mint of Belgium | La Monnaie Royale de Belgique/ Koninklijke Munt van België | 1908 | 1935 |
| United States Mint of Philadelphia | | 1919 | 1919 |
| Mint of Hamburg | Hamburgische Münze | 1887 | 1905 |

=== Photduang coinage ===
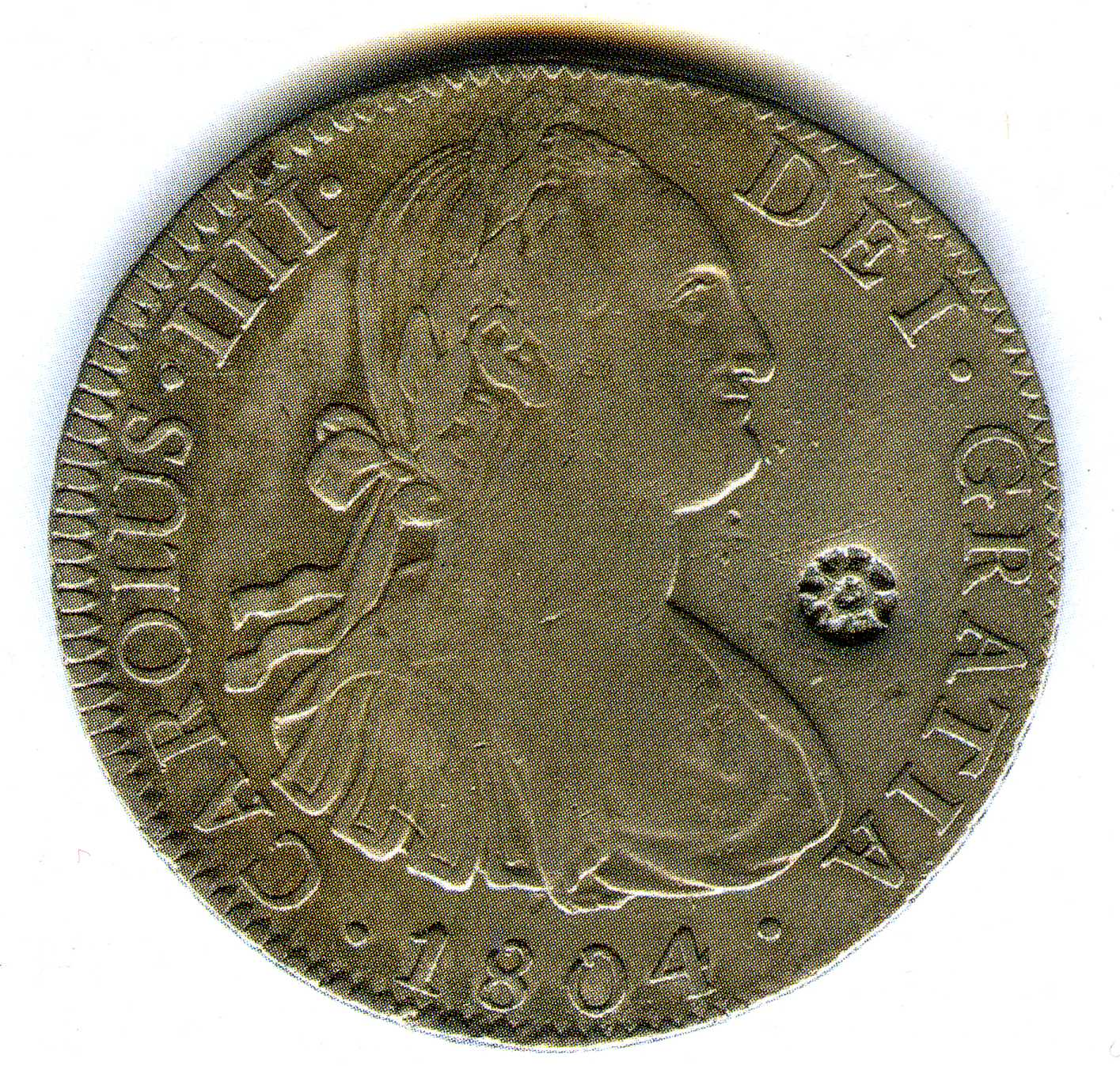
Example of the Spanish dollar which was marked with the Siamese government's emblem – marking that it is legal tender

Cowrie shells from the Mekong River had been used as currency for small amounts since the Sukhothai period. Before 1860, Thailand did not produce coins using modern methods. Instead, a so-called "bullet" coinage was used, consisting of bars of metal, thicker in the middle, bent round to form a complete circle on which identifying marks were stamped. Denominations issued included 1/128, 1/64, 1/32, 1/16, 1/8, 1/2, 1, 1 1/2, 2, 2 1/2, 4, 4 1/2, 8, 10, 20, 40 and 80 baht in silver and 1/32, 1/16, 1/8, 1/2, 1, 1 1/2, 2 and 4 baht in gold. One gold baht was generally worth 16 silver baht. Between 1858 and 1860, foreign trade coins were also stamped by the government for use in Thailand.

==== Sukhothai and Ayutthaya photduang ====
Photduang, a form of currency used during the Sukhothai period, was characterised by its longer legs, which created a larger and wider hole in the middle. These coins were primarily made of silver and featured a cut across the front of each leg. This cut served a dual purpose: it authenticated the money and allowed for the quality of the silver to be tested. Over time, as the Sukhothai Kingdom declined and became a vassal state of Ayutthaya—which was established as the capital in 1350—the design of photduang evolved. The coins became rounder with shorter legs, and the central hole, while still present, grew smaller. By the end of this era, the hole disappeared completely. The cuts on the legs also reduced in size and were eventually replaced by a small elliptical nick, known as "Met Kao San," on one side of the coin.

==== Thonburi and Rattanakosin photduang ====
The Thonburi period (1767–1782) and the Rattanakosin period, beginning in 1782, adopted the photduang design from the late Ayutthaya period. The coins from these periods had no central hole, and the legs were even shorter. A key difference was that

Siam at the time of podduang issue 4 (1805)

Thonburi photduang lacked the elliptical nick, whereas the Rattanakosin coins reintroduced this feature, similar to the Ayutthaya coins. Photduang from these later periods typically featured two stamped marks: the dynasty mark on top and the king's personal mark on the front part. The dynasty mark often symbolised the kingdom's ruling dynasty, while the king's personal mark represented the reigning monarch.

==== Markings on the photduang ====
The markings on photduang coins varied across different periods. During the Sukhothai era, some coins bore no marks, while others had up to 11. This variation was because, at that time, individuals and merchants could produce their own money. However, from the Ayutthaya period onward, the production of photduang was monopolised by the government, making it easier to identify coins from each era. Ayutthaya photduang typically bore two marks: the dynasty mark, which could be a spoked wheel symbolising the "Wheel of Law" from Buddhist teachings or the Chakra (Vishnu's weapon), represented by a pattern of 8 dots surrounding a central dot. The king's personal mark varied with each ruler and included symbols such as a conch shell, a Garuda bird (khrut), an elephant, and an anchor, each symbolising different aspects of the king's reign or divine associations.

==== Photduang timeline ====
*continues in the coin section*

==== List ====
Photduang of the Thai tical (Rama III & Rama IV)
| Image | Names | | Value | | Width (mm) | Weight (g) | Composition | Inscription, description | Dates of issue |
| Image | Primary | Secondary | in silver baht | in gold baht | Width (mm) | Weight (g) | Composition | Inscription, description | Dates of issue |
|---|---|---|---|---|---|---|---|---|---|
| | Bia เบี้ย | | 1/6400 | 1/102400 | 25 | 1.58 | Calcium carbonate | None | 1238–1869 |
| | Half Phai กึ่งไพ | At อัฐ | 1/64 | 1/1024 | 2 | 0.25 | Silver | State ensign of Rattanakosin | 1824–1851 |
| | Phai ไพ | | 1/32 | 1/512 | 4 | 0.5 | Silver | State ensign of Rattanakosin; Castle | 1824–1856 |
| | 2 Phai สองไพ | Half Fueang กึ่งเฟื้อง | 1/16 | 1/256 | 6 | 1 | Silver | State ensign of Rattanakosin; Castle | 1824–1856 |
| | Fueang เฟื้อง | | 1/8 | 1/128 | 6.5 | 1.98 | Silver | State ensign of Rattanakosin; Castle | 1824–1856 |
| | Salueng สลึง | | 1/4 | 1/64 | 9 | 3.7 | Silver | State ensign of Rattanakosin; Castle | 1824–1856 |
| | 2 Salueng สองสลึง | Half Baht กึ่งบาท | 1/2 | 1/32 | 11 | 7.6 | Silver | State ensign of Rattanakosin; Castle | 1824–1856 |
| | Baht บาท | | 1 | 1/16 | 14.5 | 15.14 | Silver | State ensign of Rattanakosin; Castle | 1824–1856 |
| | Gold 2 Phai สองไพทอง | Gold Half Fueang กึ่งเฟื้องทอง | 1 | 1/16 | 5 | 1 | Gold | State ensign of Rattanakosin; Phra Maha Mongkut seal | 1851–1856 |
| | 2 Baht สองบาท | Half Tamlueng กึ่งตำลึง | 2 | 1/8 | 17.5 | 30.30 | Silver | State ensign of Rattanakosin; Castle | 1824–1856 |
| | Gold Fueang เฟื้องทอง | | 2 | 1/8 | 6 | 1.5 | Gold | State ensign of Rattanakosin; Phra Maha Mongkut seal | 1851–1856 |
| | 4 Baht สี่บาท | Tamlueng ตำลึง | 4 | 1/4 | 23.5 | 60.50 | Silver | State ensign of Rattanakosin; Castle | 1824–1856 |
| | Gold Salueng สลึงทอง | | 4 | 1/4 | 8 | 3.7 | Gold | State ensign of Rattanakosin; Phra Maha Mongkut seal | 1851–1856 |
| | Gold 2 Salueng สองสลึงทอง | Gold Half Baht กึ่งบาททอง | 8 | 1/2 | 9.5 | 7.56 | Gold | State ensign of Rattanakosin; Phra Maha Mongkut seal | 1851–1856 |
| | Gold Baht บาททอง | | 16 | 1 | 12 | 15.14 | Gold | State ensign of Rattanakosin; Phra Maha Mongkut seal | 1851–1856 |
| | Gold 2 Baht สองบาททอง | Gold Half Tamlueng กึ่งตำลึงทอง | 32 | 2 | 16 | 30.01 | Gold | State ensign of Rattanakosin; Phra Maha Mongkut seal | 1851–1856 |
| | 40 Baht สี่สิบบาท | Half Chang กึ่งชั่ง | 40 | 2.5 | 48 | 606.5 | Silver | State ensign of Rattanakosin; Phra Maha Mongkut seal | 1860 |
| | 80 Baht แปดสิบบาท | Chang ชั่ง | 80 | 5 | 59 | 1216 | Silver | State ensign of Rattanakosin; Phra Maha Mongkut seal | 1859 |

=== Predecimal coinage ===
Rama III (1824–1851) was the first king to consider the use of a flat coin. He did so not for the convenience of traders, but because he was disturbed that the creatures living in the cowrie shells were killed. When he learned of the use of flat copper coins in Singapore in 1835, he contacted a Scottish trader, who had two types of experimental coins struck in England. The king rejected both designs. The name of the country put on these first coins was Muang Thai, not Siam.

In 1860, modern-style coins were introduced. These were silver 1 sik; 1 fueang; 1 and 2 salueng; 1, 2, and 4 baht; with the baht weighing 15.244 grams and the others weight-related. Tin 1 solot and 1 at followed in 1862, with gold 2 1/2, 4, and 8 baht introduced in 1863 and copper 2 and 4 at in 1865. Copper replaced tin in the 1 solot and 1 at in 1874, with copper 4 at introduced in 1876. The last gold coins were struck in 1895.

Siam at the time of coin issue 1, 2, 3, and 4 (1856–1875)

==== Beginning the production of flatcoins ====
While the Thai diplomatic mission led by Phraya Montri Suriyawong was in England in 1857, King Mongkut sent a letter requesting assistance in acquiring coin-minting machinery. In the letter dated November 2, 1857, he wrote:

"...I have obtained the tools to mint coins in the style of Thai coins as I have given to Chao Muen Sanphet Phakdi (Peng Penkul), the deputy envoy. Please take care of this matter and discuss it with Lord Clarendon (British Foreign Minister) so that he may help in devising a plan. This will help develop the country, as these are Thai-style coins that the people will trust and use like the Thai baht."

The King explained his intention to mint coins in denominations of one baht, half-baht, salung, and fuang, emphasizing that they should be attractive, trustworthy, and easy to produce in large quantities. He also noted concern about neighboring rulers already issuing modern coins in their own realms.

The Siamese delegation visited the factory of Joseph Taylor in Birmingham on December 10, 1857, and ordered minting machinery worth about 3,000 pounds, including engraved dies and the services of two engineers.

The machinery arrived in Bangkok in late 1858 together with its foreman, Samuel Sanders, who died shortly after arriving. Two English engineers, Charles Wigley and Barringer, continued the installation. Wigley later died in 1868 after falling from his houseboat on the Chao Phraya River, while Barringer died of dysentery in 1869. Mod Amatyakul eventually oversaw the continuation of the project.

The minting machinery became operational in 1860 at the new mint near the Grand Palace, called the "Royal Mint of Sitthikan." An official proclamation described the new silver coins:

"...Therefore, His Majesty has conceived the idea of establishing a new mint for silver coins and the coins by setting the price of Thai coins at one baht as the base, and denominate the silver coins into of two salung, one salung and etc"

These coins featured the Great Victory Crown, royal umbrellas, wheel designs, and elephant emblems. Different denominations were identified by star patterns representing gears. Gold coins were also minted. The machine-struck silver and gold coins circulated from 1860 until the original machinery broke down in 1870. To expand production, a second mint was built near the original site and completed in 1875. New machinery from England arrived in 1876, and King Chulalongkorn officially opened the mint on May 31, 1876. The proclamation stated:

"...As His Majesty King Mongkut graciously ordered the establishment of machinery to mint baht, salung, and fuang coins to replace the previous reign's bullet money, this new mint shall continue to be used until the present reign."

The new coins carried a portrait of King Chulalongkorn on one side and the Siamese national emblem on the other. The proclamation further declared:

"These three types of money are to be used by the people normally, and the emblem bearing the image of the King should not be considered sacred or low-status. It may be placed in a basket or container. No one is allowed to misrepresent it or misuse it. Anyone who arrests the people and causes them distress will be punished according to the law..."

In 1901, Siam built a third mint on Chao Fa Road equipped with electrically powered machinery capable of producing 80,000–100,000 baht worth of coins per day. The mint continued producing coins bearing the portrait of Rama V and the national coat of arms until 1972, when operations moved to the modern Royal Thai Mint on Pradiphat Road in Bangkok. Modern coinage laws followed the expansion of machine minting. The Currency Act of 1902 and the Gold Standard Act of 1908 formally regulated Siamese currency. The Act defined:

"Mint" means the government mint in Bangkok.

"Mint coin" means a metal block minted by any government for use as currency.

"Small coins" means mint coins with a value less than 1 baht, and one baht coin shall be divided into 100 satang.

Older feung, att, and sot coins were gradually withdrawn and replaced with satang-denominated currency. The Thai term "กระษาปณ์" (krasaap), meaning currency or coinage, first appeared in early mint regulations. It derives from an ancient Indian copper currency term and is today officially written as "กษาปณ์".

==== Issue 0 – 1835 - Muang Thai Series (trial series) ====
During the reign of King Rama III (1824–1851), an initiative was made to introduce Thailand's first flat coinage, intended to replace the widely used cowrie shells. To aid in this modernisation of the monetary system, the king employed Robert Hunter, a Scottish merchant, to produce pattern coins.

King Rama III had the idea to produce copper cowrie shells to replace cowrie shells, which were live animals. He ordered Phraya Phra Khlang (Dis) to design and make a sample for his inspection. Phraya Phra Khlang (Dis) contacted Mr. Robert Hunter, a Scottish merchant who had a trading post in Bangkok, to order a sample. Upon receiving it, it was presented to the King for inspection, but he did not approve of it. Therefore, no copper cowrie shells were produced during the reign of Rama III.

The proposed designs featured an elephant motif, which bore resemblance to the coinage of Lanka (modern-day Sri Lanka). Concerned about the symbolic inappropriateness of the elephant, which could imply foreign influence or association, King Rama III ultimately rejected all of the submitted patterns. As a result, none of the proposed coins were officially adopted or denominated.

These pattern coins, though never circulated, represent an early attempt at modernisation of Siamese currency prior to the eventual adoption of machine-struck coinage in the reign of King Rama IV.

Table for Issue 0 - 1835 - Muang Thai Series
| Image | | Denomination | Weight | Dimensions | Mintages | Compositions | Inscriptions | | Date of Issue | Designer / Sculptor |
| Obverse | Reverse | Denomination | Weight | Dimensions | Mintages | Compositions | Obverse | Reverse | Date of Issue | Designer / Sculptor |
|---|---|---|---|---|---|---|---|---|---|---|
| | | non-denomionated | 4.3g | 23mm | 500 | Copper | Elephant Seal ๑๑๙๗ (CS. 1197) | A set of stars เมืองไทย (Land of the Thais) | 1835 | Phraya Phra Khlang (Dis) สมเด็จเจ้าพระยาบรมมหาประยูรวงศ์ |
| | | non-denomionated | 4.30g | 23mm | 500 | Copper | Lotus Seal ๑๑๙๗ (CS. 1197) | A set of stars เมืองไทย (Land of the Thais) | 1835 | Phraya Phra Khlang (Dis) สมเด็จเจ้าพระยาบรมมหาประยูรวงศ์ |
| | | non-denomionated | 4.30g | 23mm | 500 | Silver | Elephant Seal ๑๑๙๗ (CS. 1197) | A set of stars เมืองไทย (Land of the Thais) | 1835 | Phraya Phra Khlang (Dis) สมเด็จเจ้าพระยาบรมมหาประยูรวงศ์ |
| | | non-denomionated | 4.30g | 23mm | 500 | Silver | Lotus Seal ๑๑๙๗ (CS. 1197) | A set of stars เมืองไทย (Land of the Thais) | 1835 | Phraya Phra Khlang (Dis) สมเด็จเจ้าพระยาบรมมหาประยูรวงศ์ |

==== Issue 1 – 1856 (transitional) - Mongkut Regalia - Krungthep Series ====
The first issue of coins were commissioned by Rama IV, though it was never brought into circulation. This was one of the first attempt to replace the bullet coins, but few were ever minted without making it into circulation.

Table for Issue 1.1 - 1835 - Mongkut Regalia Series
| Image | | Denomination | Weight | Dimensions | Mintages | Compositions | Inscriptions | | Date of Issue | Designer / Sculptor |
| Obverse | Reverse | Denomination | Weight | Dimensions | Mintages | Compositions | Obverse | Reverse | Date of Issue | Designer / Sculptor |
|---|---|---|---|---|---|---|---|---|---|---|
| | | Half-Fueang กึ่งเฟื้อง | 1.00g | 12.5mm | Unknown | Gold | Chakra Seal Great Crown of Victory Seal Sacred Water Vessel Seal | none | 1856 | Unknown |
| | | Salueng สลึง | 3.70g | 16.0mm | Unknown | Silver | Chakra Seal Great Crown of Victory Seal Sacred Water Vessel Seal | none | 1856 | Unknown |
| | | Fueang เฟื้อง | 1.85g | 12.5mm | Unknown | Silver | Chakra Seal Great Crown of Victory Seal Sacred Water Vessel Seal | none | 1856 | Unknown |

Table for Issue 1.2 - 1835 - Krung Thep Series
| Image | | Denomination | Weight | Dimensions | Mintages | Compositions | Inscriptions | | Date of Issue | Designer / Sculptor |
| Obverse | Reverse | Denomination | Weight | Dimensions | Mintages | Compositions | Obverse | Reverse | Date of Issue | Designer / Sculptor |
|---|---|---|---|---|---|---|---|---|---|---|
| | | Salueng สลึง | 3.80g | 20.0mm | Unknown | Gold | Great Crown of Victory Seal | กรุงเทพ (ฺBangkok) | 1856 | Unknown |
| | | Fueang เฟื้อง | 1.80g | 15.0mm | Unknown | Gold | Great Crown of Victory Seal | กรุงเทพ (ฺBangkok) | 1856 | Unknown |
| | | Salueng สลึง | 3.80g | 20.0mm | Unknown | Silver | Great Crown of Victory Seal | กรุงเทพ (ฺBangkok) | 1856 | Unknown |
| | | Fueang เฟื้อง | 1.80g | 15.0mm | Unknown | Silver | Great Crown of Victory Seal | กรุงเทพ (ฺBangkok) | 1856 | Unknown |

==== Issue 2, 3 – 1860, 1869 – Tributary Series & Great Chula Seal Series ====
This series in thai is called: เหรียญบรรณาการ (Rian Bannakan) which means tributary coins or coin gifts. As this series of coins was produced using manually operated machinery that had been presented as a royal gift by Queen Victoria of England. Due to the limited production capacity of these machines, the coins could not be minted in sufficient quantities to meet the country's demand. Consequently, their use was discontinued. This coincided with the arrival of steam-powered machinery, which allowed for more efficient and larger-scale coin production. It is worth noting that coins of the half-fuang denomination were not mentioned in official announcements.

Though the silver coins within issue 2 has three production date: 1857, 1860, and 1863 in which they differ slightly in design, they are nevertheless counted as a single issue. 1857 issue was the original sets which were given by Queen Victoria.

The first circulating issue of the Siamese coins. This marked the start of the move away from using photduang currency. Though in this era, the photduang were still legal tender. In this series, the lower denominations were made of silver, and the higher ones were made of gold. These higher denominations were given nicknames: pot dueng, pit, and tot. Pot dueng means thirty two, as in 1/32 of a chang. The other nickname was the chinkang or one Chinese tamlueng. The pit means twenty, as in 1/20 of a chang, the other name is ekkang, or one thai tamlueng. The tot means ten, as in 1/10 of a chang. The coin was also called thukkang, which means two tamlueng. In the lower denominations materials such as tin, copper and brass are used, since these are quite low value.

In 1857, a series of trial coins were produced. But due to the broken and rusted die pieces along with the rusted minting press, the coins of this trial series were not to the satisfaction of Rama IV, hence testing continued. The flawed coins of this series is noted to have an inconsistent and rough "sand-like" texture. In 1857–1860 small amounts of trial circulation coins were produced to circulate within the palace walls, so that the noblemen could give feedback and test the new system.

According to the Thai Treasury, regarding the gold coins, they were minted during a period when large amounts of gold were entering Thailand. Inspired by the widespread use of gold coins in other countries, such as the gold coins of England, King Mongkut (Rama IV) ordered the production of gold coins for domestic use. These coins, with their higher value, facilitated trade as the silver coins in circulation at the time were of lower value. They were officially issued on October 29, 1863, and were withdrawn from use in 1908.

In 1863, following reports of an increase in gold reserves, Rama IV ordered the production of gold coins to supplement the existing silver series. Although intended for general circulation, the coins were unfamiliar to the public and consequently, many coins were converted into jewellery. Fully intact specimens without holes are considered rare today.

In 1866, these thin copper coins, in sik (half-fuang) and siao (quarter-fuang) denominations, were produced to replace their thicker counterparts, which were heavier and had the same value. The decision to issue lighter, thinner coins was made after an incident where King Mongkut (Rama IV) distributed the thicker coins during a charitable event, and recipients were injured with head wounds and bruises. His Majesty considered that the copper coins already bore stamped marks and inscriptions (indicating that 2 coins equalled 1 fuang and 4 coins equalled 1 fuang), making them trustworthy. Therefore, thinner and lighter coins would still serve their purpose effectively without causing harm.

With the crowning of King Rama 5 in 1868, his majesty decided to tackle the massive counterfeiting of base-metal coins in his era. His majesty decided to produce a new large solot (1/128 baht) coin so that the old smaller solot coin were rendered unusable and unprofitable to counterfeit. The large solot coins were only produced for a small period of time, but the coin fulfilled its duties and eliminated a huge portion of counterfeited productions.

These tin coins were extensively counterfeited, and brought in from Hong Kong.

Table for Issue 2 - 1860 - Tributary Series
| Image | | Denomination | Weight | Dimensions | Mintages | Compositions | Inscriptions | | Date of Issue | Designer / Sculptor |
| Obverse | Reverse | Denomination | Weight | Dimensions | Mintages | Compositions | Obverse | Reverse | Date of Issue | Designer / Sculptor |
|---|---|---|---|---|---|---|---|---|---|---|
| | | Solot โสฬส 0 / 0 / ½ | 3.62g | 23mm × 2mm | Unknown | Tin Copper Tin Oxide Alloy | Great Mongkut Seal | Siamese State Ensign สิบ หก อัน เป็น เฟื้อง Sixteen makes a Fuang 1/16 F. 方 片 六 十 | 1862 production halted November 15, 1868 | Bank of Siam |
| | | At อัฐ 0 / 0 / 1 | 7.61g | 29mm × 2mm | Unknown | Tin Copper Tin Oxide Alloy | Great Mongkut Seal | Siamese State Ensign แปด อัน เปน เฟื้อง; Eight makes a Fuang 1/8 F. 方 片 捌 | 1864 | Bank of Siam |
| | | Siao เสี้ยว 0 / 0 / 2 | 8.30g (old) 3.90g (new) | 22mm × 3mm | Unknown | Copper (regular circ.) Brass (trial circ.) | Great Mongkut Seal | Siamese State Ensign สี่ อัน เปน เฟื้อง; Four makes a Fuang 1/4 F. 方 片 四 | December 13, 1865 (thick) March 29, 1866 (thin) demonetized May 17, 1909 | Bank of Siam |
| | | Sik ซีก 0 / 0 / 4 | 15.8g (old) 7.50g (new) | 29mm × 3mm | Unknown | Copper (regular circ.) Brass (trial circ.) | Great Mongkut Seal | Siamese State Ensign สอง อัน เปน เฟื้อง; Two makes a Fuang 1/2 F. 方 片 二 | December 13, 1865 (thick) March 29, 1866 (thin) demonetized May 17, 1909 | Bank of Siam |
| | | Half Fueang ครึ่งเฟื้อง 0 / 0 / 4 | 1.00g | 13mm × 1mm | Unknown | Silver 90.00% (regular circ.) Gold 91.67% (regular circ.) Gold 99.97% (trial circ.) | Great Mongkut Seal | Siamese State Ensign | September 17, 1860 1863 (gold) | Bank of England |
| | | Fueang เฟื้อง 0 / 1 / 0 | 1.94g | 16 × 1 | Unknown | Silver 90.00% (regular circ.) Gold 91.67% (regular circ.) Gold 99.97% (trial circ.) | Great Mongkut Seal ✶ 1 star | Siamese State Ensign ✶ 1 star | 1857 (gift from Victoria) September 17, 1860 1863 (gold) demonetized October 1913 | Bank of England |
| | | Salueng สลึง 0 / 2 / 0 | 3.71g | 22mm × 1mm | Unknown | Silver 90.00% (regular circ.) Gold 91.67% (regular circ.) Gold 99.97% (trial circ.) | Great Mongkut Seal ✶✶ 2 stars | Siamese State Ensign ✶✶ 2 stars | 1857 (gift from Victoria) September 17, 1860 1863 (gold) demonetized October 1913 | Bank of England |
| | | Half Baht ครึ่งบาท 0 / 4 / 0 | 7.54g | 27mm × 1mm | Unknown | Silver 90.00% (regular circ.) Gold 91.67% (regular circ.) Gold 99.97% (trial circ.) | Great Mongkut Seal ✶✶✶✶ 4 stars | Siamese State Ensign ✶✶✶✶ 4 stars | 1857 (gift from Victoria) September 17, 1860 1863 (gold) demonetized October 1913 | Bank of England |
| | | Baht บาท 1 / 0 / 0 | 15.33g | 31mm × 1mm | Unknown | Silver 90.00% (regular circ.) Gold 91.67% (regular circ.) Gold 99.97% (trial circ.) | Great Mongkut Seal ✶✶✶✶✶✶✶✶ 8 stars | Siamese State Ensign ✶✶✶✶✶✶✶✶ 8 stars | 1857 (gift from Victoria) September 17, 1860 1863 (gold) demonetized April 1914 | Bank of England |
| | | Half Tamlueng กึ่งตำลึง 2 / 0 / 0 | 30.00g | 37mm × 2.5mm | Unknown | Silver 90.00% (regular circ.) Gold 91.67% (regular circ.) Gold 99.97% (trial circ.) | Great Mongkut Seal ✶✶✶✶✶✶✶✶ ✶✶✶✶✶✶✶✶ 16 stars | Siamese State Ensign ✶✶✶✶✶✶✶✶ ✶✶✶✶✶✶✶✶ 16 stars | 1863 demonetized April 1914 | Bank of Siam |
| | | Tamlueng ตำลึง 4 / 0 / 0 | 7.61g | 45mm × 4mm | Unknown | Silver 90.00% (regular circ.) Gold 91.67% (regular circ.) Gold 99.97% (trial circ.) | Great Mongkut Seal | 鄭明通寶 zhèng míng tōng bǎo "Zheng Ming Legal Currency" กรุงสยาม Land of Siam | 1864 | Bank of Siam |
| | | Paddueng พัดดึงส์ 2 / 4 / 0 | 1.90g | 16mm × 0.8mm | Unknown | Gold 91.67% (1st circ.) Gold 99.97% (2nd circ.) | Great Mongkut Seal | Siamese State Ensign | 1857 demonetized 1908 | Bank of Siam |
| | | Pit พิศ 4 / 0 / 0 | 3.10g | 17mm × 1mm | Unknown | Gold 91.67% (1st circ.) Gold 99.97% (2nd circ.) | Great Mongkut Seal | Siamese State Ensign | 1863 demonetized 1908 | Bank of Siam |
| | | Tot ทศ 8 / 0 / 0 | 8.00g | 22mm × 1mm | Unknown | Gold 91.67% (1st circ.) Gold 99.97% (2nd circ.) | Great Mongkut Seal | Siamese State Ensign | 1863 demonetized 1908 | Bank of Siam |
*Baht / Fuang / At - nondecimal notation is used to convey value*

Table for Issue 3 - 1868 - Great Chula Seal Series
| Image | | Denomination | Weight | Dimensions | Mintages | Compositions | Inscriptions | | Date of Issue | Designer / Sculptor |
| Obverse | Reverse | Denomination | Weight | Dimensions | Mintages | Compositions | Obverse | Reverse | Date of Issue | Designer / Sculptor |
|---|---|---|---|---|---|---|---|---|---|---|
| | | Solot โสฬส 0 / 0 / ½ | 7.50g | 32mm × 2mm | Unknown | Tin Copper Tin Oxide Alloy | Great Chula Seal | Siamese State Ensign สิบ หก อัน เป็น เฟื้อง Sixteen makes a Fuang 1/16 F. 方 片 六 十 | November 16, 1868 demonetized April 14, 1875 | Bank of Siam |
| | | Fueang เฟื้อง 0 / 1 / 0 | 1.89g | 16mm × 1mm | Unknown | Silver 90.00% | Great Chula Seal ✶ 8 stars | Siamese State Ensign ✶ 8 stars | 1869 | Bank of Siam |
| | | Salueng สลึง 0 / 2 / 0 | 3.82g | 22mm × 1mm | Unknown | Silver 90.00% | Great Chula Seal ✶✶ 8 stars | Siamese State Ensign ✶✶ 8 stars | 1869 | Bank of Siam |
| | | Baht บาท 1 / 0 / 0 | 15.10g | 31mm × 1mm | Unknown | Silver 90.00% | Great Chula Seal ✶✶✶✶✶✶✶✶ 8 stars | Siamese State Ensign ✶✶✶✶✶✶✶✶ 8 stars | 1869 | Bank of Siam |

==== Issue 4 – 1875 – Chulalongkorn Monogram Series ====
The first series to depict king Rama V, the coins of this issue were made of copper, silver, and gold. Though gold was strangely only used for the 1 fueang denomination. The new shield emblem was introduced in this issue. This shield was separated into three section. Drawing from western influences, symbols within these sections represented territories Siam was controlling. The tree-headed elephant represented Siamese territory, the bottom-left elephant represented Lan Xang, and the warangka represented Siamese Malaya.

Due to a malfunction in the minting machinery at the government mint, which prevented the production of circulating coinage, King Chulalongkorn ordered the design of this coin series and commissioned its production by a mint in Birmingham. This marked the first time that coins were minted abroad for circulation in Siam. The copper coins in this issue were made in the same size as the coins of the United Kingdom, with the Solot being the same size as the Farthing, the Att being the same size as the Half-Penny, and the Siao being the same size as the Penny. The silver coins differ in size to the British counterpart due to the baht being pegged to a different unit of silver. The copper coin in this case were base metal and were not pegged to any standard metal, hence their size tend to differ more throughout history. These copper coins only represent a certain amount of silver.

These silver coins were minted when the Sathit Kuang machinery was put into use in 1889 at the Sathit Kuang Coin Mint, marking the beginning of a new coinage system. The year markings started to appear on the coins from R.S. 120 (1898) onwards.

===== On the use of the national emblem =====
The national coat of arms used during the reign of Chulalongkorn was designed in 1873 by Pravich Chumsai. The emblem consisted of several symbolic elements representing the monarchy, the Chakri dynasty, and the territories of Siam.

Symbolism of the Coat of Arms

1. The Great Crown of Victory, together with rays and royal umbrellas, represented the monarchy and royal authority.
2. The Chakra and Trident symbolized the Chakri Dynasty.
3. The central shield was divided into three sections:
  - The three-headed elephant Airavata represented Northern, Central, and Southern Siam united as the Kingdom of Siam.
  - The white elephant standing on a pedestal represented Laos, then a tributary state of Siam.
  - The crossed curved and straight daggers represented the Malay tributary states.
4. Supporting figures on each side included:
  - A lion, symbolizing the supremacy of the Ministry of Interior in civil affairs.
  - An elephant-lion, symbolizing the supremacy of the Ministry of Defense in military affairs.
5. The Royal Order of the Nine Jewels represented Buddhism and indicated that recipients were required to be Buddhists according to the Royal Decorations Act. The Order of Chulalongkorn symbolized royal favor toward members of the royal family and individuals who had rendered distinguished service to the kingdom.
6. The motto:

"Sap Phes Song Phutan Samaggi Wutthisadhika"

was composed by Sa and translates as:

"The unity of the people brings about prosperity."

A simplified version of the coat of arms was used on Siamese coinage. This abbreviated national emblem removed the lion, elephant-lion, royal necklaces, motto, and decorative ornaments, leaving only:

- The three-part shield
- Airavata
- The white elephant
- Crossed daggers
- The Chakra and Trident
- The Great Crown of Victory
- Royal umbrellas

This simplified emblem appeared especially on one-baht and two-baht coins. After Siam lost territories to European colonial powers, the emblem was gradually abandoned. These territorial losses included:Luang Prabang, Vientiane, and Champasak which were ceded to France in 1903, along with Burapha territories in 1906, and the four Malay states ceded to United Kingdom in 1909. Following these losses, the national coat of arms was replaced on coins by the Airavata emblem.

Near the end of the reign of King Rama V, coins were designed featuring the King's portrait together with the Airavata emblem, but they were not released into circulation before his death. The national emblem later reappeared on Thai coinage during the reign of Bhumibol Adulyadej. Coins bearing the emblem were issued in:

- 1950 (B.E. 2493)
- 1957 (B.E. 2500)

and on the commemorative coin celebrating the King's return to Bangkok in 1961 (B.E. 2504). In 1962 (B.E. 2505), one-baht nickel circulation coins again used the national coat of arms, although the crown in this version no longer displayed the halo rays found in the earlier design.

===== Decree of October 29th 1863: Proclaiming sizes and specification of denominations =====
2nd day of the waning moon of the 11th month in the year of the Pig (5th cycle), equivalent to Oct. 29th, 1863, King Mongkut announced the minting of three gold coins for general use as currency. After pointing out that all important countries issued a gold coinage, but that hitherto Siam had been without one, His Majesty stated that he had issued a Royal Command to the Mint to prepare 3 values of coins, of gold 8.5 fine ("thong kham neiá pát sétsong"), i.e., gold leaf of the Chop Ann Seng, the first equal in value to 8 Ticals silver, the second to 4 Ticals, and the third to 2½ Ticals, the last named to represent the weight of a Chinese "tael". He went on to say that the types of these coins had been borrowed from those of the English sovereign and half-sovereign; but that the latter coins were an alloy of gold and copper, containing of the latter 1 in 12 (i.e. 22 carat gold) for the purpose of hardening the coin. He was afraid, however, that the Siamese folk would askance at gold coins which were not pure.

....

On one side (the obverse) there is a picture of the Royal Crown in the centre. There are Royal Umbrellas supporting it on both sides. There are branches of trees, looking like flames, added to the background of the coin.

On the other side (the reverse) is a picture of the "Chakr". In the heart of the "Chakr" is a picture of an Elephant, symbolical of the Kingdom of Siam. On the outside of the circle round the "Chakr", in the case of the Tical value, are 8 stars, each star representing 1 Fuang; the 2 Salung piece has 4 stars, representing 4 Fuang; the Salung has two stars, and the Fuang 1 star.

— Royal Siamese Government, Decree of October 29th, 1863

===== Decree of June 29th 1874: Proclaiming the use of temporary paper money, in order to transition into the new series of coins =====
The tin Atts and Solots which had been minted and put into circulation in the place of cowries in the last reign have been much counterfeited, and when the legal value of the Att was subsequently reduced to twenty cowries, a great many of these coins disappeared, while no more have been manufactured owing to the fact that copper ones could not be produced with the existing machinery. Bigger machines of greater power are being ordered, and as soon as they are installed and ready for working, the Mint will produce such copper coins as will challenge the ingenuity of counterfeiters. At present, however, the public are taxed with the token coins of the gaming house Farmers (Pee, q. v.), which are accepted only in their respective issuing districts and only during their issuers' tenure of the district monopoly. H. M. the King has now been pleased to command the printing of paper "atts", each sealed with the Royal Arms of two different sizes, and all numbered in consecutive order to differentiate them from each other. Should any note be found with the same number as another, the counterfeit note will probably be discovered after a careful examination of the seal-marks and the framework design. These paper "atts" shall be legal currency for the time being until copper coins can be issued after the installation of the new machinery. Anyone having more of them than he needs may present them for payment at the Treasury between 11 A. M. and 3 P. M., and their value will be paid him that same day. Should any of the notes presented be torn in two or more places, it will be accepted as long as the pieces can be formed into one and the same note, and no commission whatever will be charged on its payment.

By command of H. M. the King, therefore, Phya Rajbhakdi Sriratanarajsombat, Knight Grand Cross of the Order of the Crown of Siam and Knight Grand Cross of the Order of Chula Chom Klao, hereby notifies to all, high and low, that, from the first day of the waxing moon in the second eighth month of the year of the Dog, sixth of the current cycle, the Treasury will issue paper "atts" instead of tin coins till the Mint is completely furnished (when copper coins will be manufactured to replace these paper "atts"), and that these paper "atts" may be freely used by the public without fear of loss.

Proclaimed on Monday, the first day of the waning moon in the first eight month of the year of the Dog, sixth of the current cycle, Chula Era 1234, being the seventh year of the present Reign.

— Royal Siamese Government, Decree of June 29th, 1874

Table for Issue 4 - 1875 - Chulalongkorn Monogram Series
| Image | | Denomination | Weight | Dimensions | Mintages | Compositions | Inscriptions | | Date of Issue | Designer / Sculptor |
| Obverse | Reverse | Denomination | Weight | Dimensions | Mintages | Compositions | Obverse | Reverse | Date of Issue | Designer / Sculptor |
|---|---|---|---|---|---|---|---|---|---|---|
| | | Solot โสฬส 0 / 0 / ½ | 2.5g | 20mm × 1mm | 2.56 million | Copper | กรุงสยาม (Kingdom of Siam) Monogram of Rama V จ.ป.ร. (มหาจุฬาลงกรณ์ ปรมราชาธิราช) รัชกาลที่ ๕ (5th Reign) | Java Cassia Wreath โสลด ๑๖ อันเฟื้อง Solot, Sixteen makes a Fuang ๑๒๓๖ (CS 1236) | April 14, 1875 – 1883 | Bank of Siam |
| | | At อัฐ 0 / 0 / 1 | 5.5 g | 25mm × 1mm | 15.3 million | Copper | กรุงสยาม (Kingdom of Siam) Monogram of Rama V จ.ป.ร. (มหาจุฬาลงกรณ์ ปรมราชาธิราช) รัชกาลที่ ๕ (5th Reign) | Java Cassia Wreath อัฐ ๘ อันเฟื้อง At, Eight makes a Fuang ๑๒๓๖ (CS 1236) | April 14, 1875 – 1883 | Bank of Siam |
| | | Siao เสี้ยว 0 / 0 / 2 | 11.0 g | 30.5mm × 2mm | 10.2 million | Copper | กรุงสยาม (Kingdom of Siam) Monogram of Rama V จ.ป.ร. (มหาจุฬาลงกรณ์ ปรมราชาธิราช) รัชกาลที่ ๕ (5th Reign) | Java Cassia Wreath เสี้ยว ๔ อันเฟื้อง Siao, Four makes a Fuang ๑๒๓๖ (CS 1236) | April 14, 1875 – 1883 | Bank of Siam |
| | | Sik ซีก 0 / 0 / 4 | 22.0 g | 38.5mm × 2.5mm | Unknown | Copper | กรุงสยาม (Kingdom of Siam) Monogram of Rama V จ.ป.ร. (มหาจุฬาลงกรณ์ ปรมราชาธิราช) รัชกาลที่ ๕ (5th Reign) | Java Cassia Wreath สิ้ก ๒ อันเฟื้อง Sik, Two makes a Fuang ๑๒๓๘ (CS 1238) | April 14, 1875 – 1883 | Bank of Siam |
| | | Fueang เฟื้อง 0 / 1 / 0 | 1.87 g | 16mm × 0.9mm | 7.41 million | Silver 90.00% | Rama V's 1st Portrait สมเด็จพระปรมินทรมหาจุฬาลงกรณ์ (His Majesty King Chulalongkorn) พระจุลจอมเกล้าเจ้าอยู่หัว (King Chulalongkorn) | Siamese State Seal กรุงสยาม Siam รัชกาลที่๕ 5th Reign กึ่งตำลึง Half Tamlueng | 1875 demonetized May 3, 1909 | Bank of Siam |
| | | Fueang เฟื้อง 0 / 1 / 0 | 1.87 g | 16mm × 0.9mm | 3.8 million (dated) | Silver 90.00% | Rama V's 1st Portrait สมเด็จพระปรมินทรมหาจุฬาลงกรณ์ (His Majesty King Chulalongkorn) พระจุลจอมเกล้าเจ้าอยู่หัว (King Chulalongkorn) | ๑๒๐ (RS. 120) | 1901–1908 demonetized May 3, 1909 | Bank of Siam |
There was a batch of gold fuang coin produced with the exact same specifications in Gold 99.97%
| | | Salueng สลึง 0 / 2 / 0 | 3.75 g | 20.5mm × 1mm | 6.08 million | Silver 90.00% | Rama V's 1st Portrait สมเด็จพระปรมินทรมหาจุฬาลงกรณ์ (His Majesty King Chulalongkorn) พระจุลจอมเกล้าเจ้าอยู่หัว (King Chulalongkorn) | Siamese State Seal กรุงสยาม Siam รัชกาลที่๕ 5th Reign เฟื้องหนึ่ง 1 fueang | 1875 demonetized October 1, 1913 | Bank of Siam |
| | | Salueng สลึง 0 / 2 / 0 | 3.75 g | 20.5mm × 1mm | 2.46 million (dated) | Silver 90.00% | Rama V's 1st Portrait สมเด็จพระปรมินทรมหาจุฬาลงกรณ์ (His Majesty King Chulalongkorn) พระจุลจอมเกล้าเจ้าอยู่หัว (King Chulalongkorn) | ๑๒๐ (RS. 120) | 1901–1908 demonetized October 1, 1913 | Bank of Siam |
| | | Baht บาท 1 / 0 / 0 | 15.0 g | 31mm × 2mm | 68.5 million | Silver 90.00% | Rama V's 1st Portrait สมเด็จพระปรมินทรมหาจุฬาลงกรณ์ (His Majesty King Chulalongkorn) พระจุลจอมเกล้าเจ้าอยู่หัว (King Chulalongkorn) | Siamese State Seal กรุงสยาม Siam รัชกาลที่๕ 5th Reign บาทหนึ่ง 1 baht | 1875 demonetized February 20 1913 | Bank of Siam |
| | | Baht บาท 1 / 0 / 0 | 15.0 g | 31mm × 2mm | 59.1 million (dated) | Silver 90.00% | Rama V's 1st Portrait สมเด็จพระปรมินทรมหาจุฬาลงกรณ์ (His Majesty King Chulalongkorn) พระจุลจอมเกล้าเจ้าอยู่หัว (King Chulalongkorn) | ๑๒๐ (RS. 120) | 1901–1908 demonetized February 20 1913 | Bank of Siam |
| | | Half Tamlueng กึ่งตำลึง 2 / 0 / 0 | 30.0 g | 37mm × 3mm | Unknown (never released into circulation) | Silver 90.00% | Rama V's 1st Portrait สมเด็จพระปรมินทรมหาจุฬาลงกรณ์ (His Majesty King Chulalongkorn) พระจุลจอมเกล้าเจ้าอยู่หัว (King Chulalongkorn) | Siamese State Seal กรุงสยาม Siam รัชกาลที่๕ 5th Reign กึ่งตำลึง Half Tamlueng | 1877 | Bank of Siam |

==== Issue 5 – 1888 – Siam Devadhiraj Series ====
Siam at the time of coin issue 5 (1888)

This was a minor issue (not all denominations were updated), in which the lower denominations' designs were updated to incorporate the three-parted shield into the design. This shield is a part of the national seal at the time. This copper coin was produced to replace previous versions and was minted in England, with additional production by the Royal Mint of Thailand. In this issue, depending on where the coin was minted, the minting alignment was different. This means that in this specific series, the alignment will show at which mint the coin was minted. For example, in this series there were four mints which contributed to the minting: Royal Mint of Belgium, Bangkok Mint, Heaton and Sons (Burmingham Mint), and Hamburgische Münze. For the 1 Solot coin, the coin minted in the year R.S. 109 was medal aligned and was minted in the Birmingham Mint, but R.S. 118 coins were minted in Hamburg had coin alignement. Medal alignment is where the portrait of the king is facing up, with the back's design also facing up. Coin alignment is where the sides of the coins' designs are flipped.

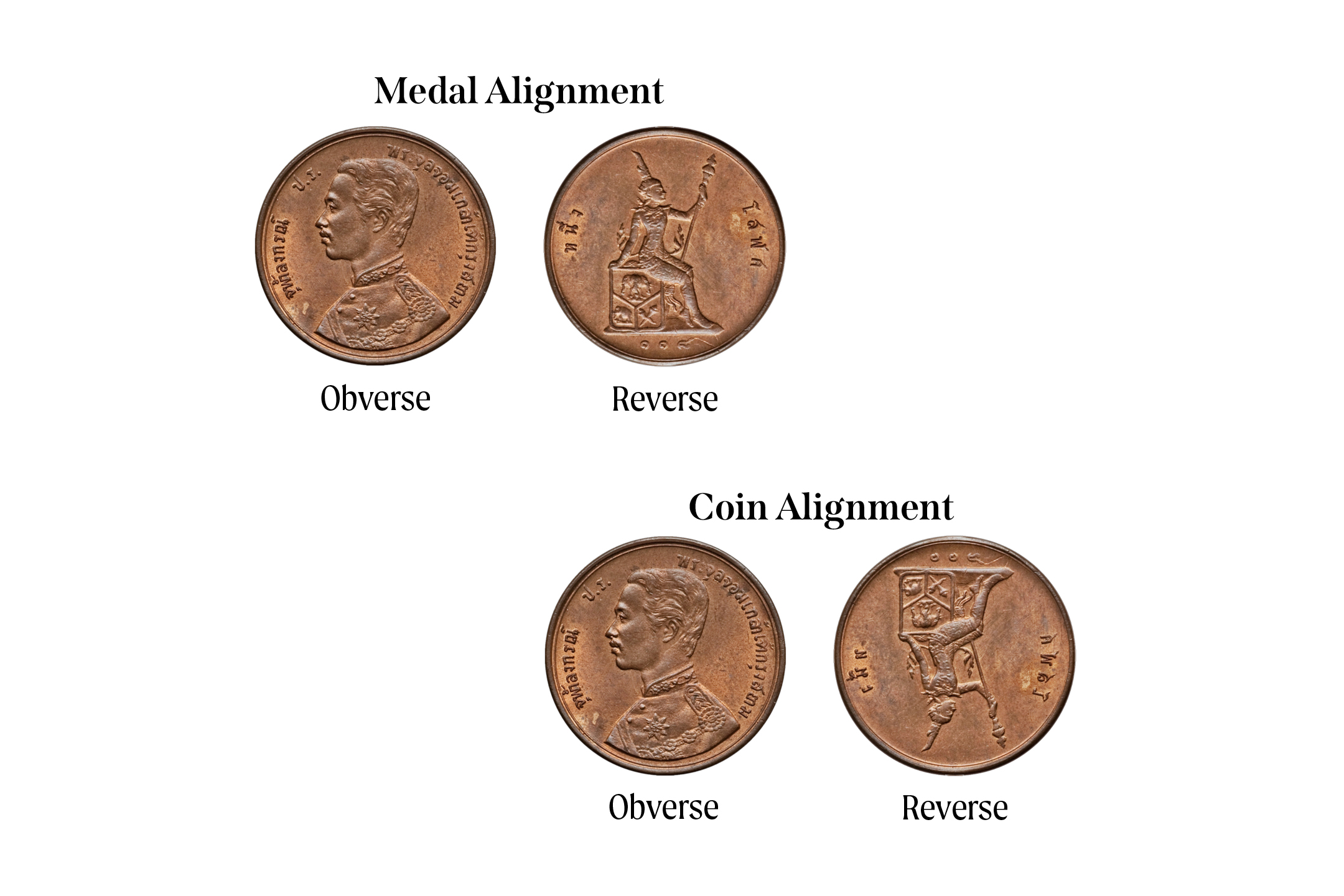

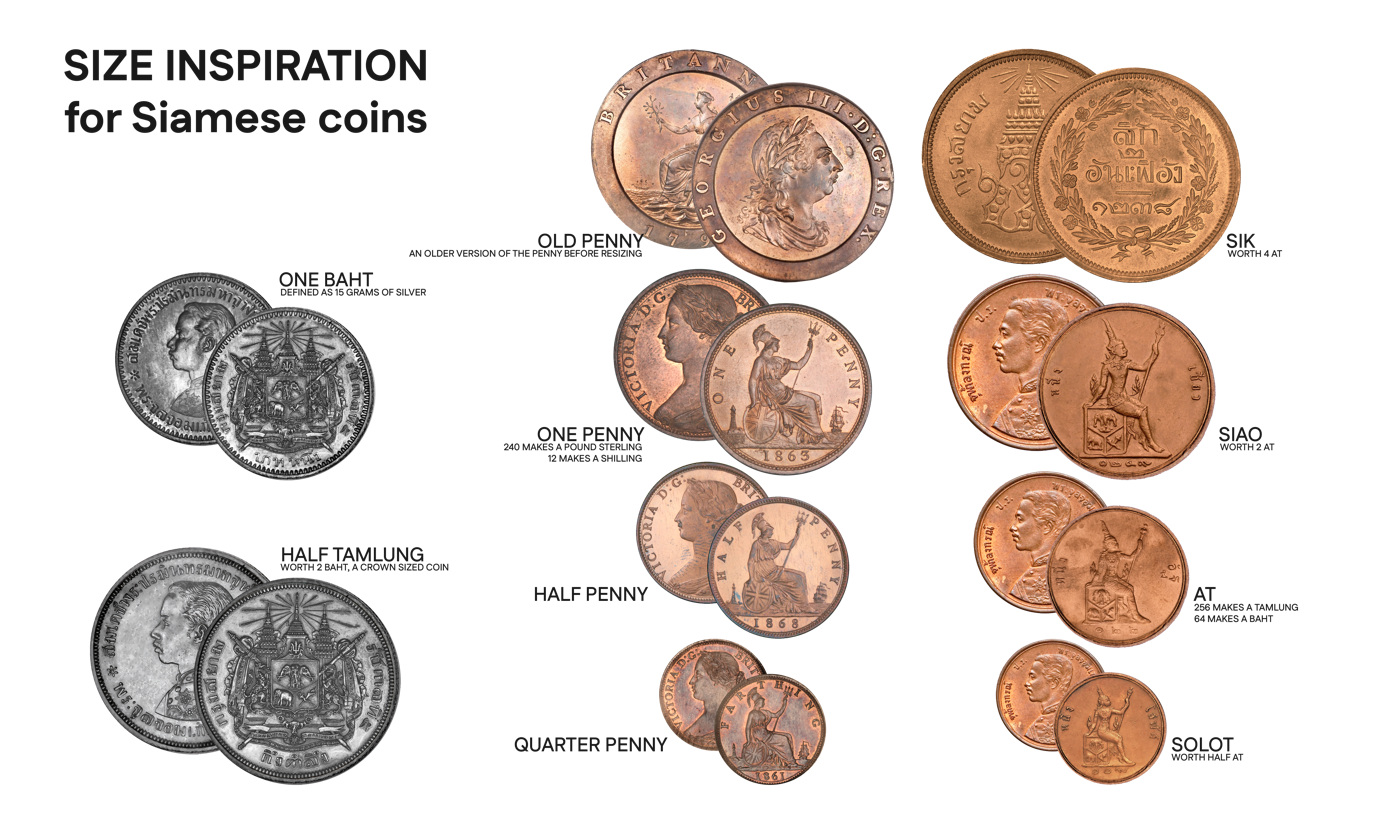

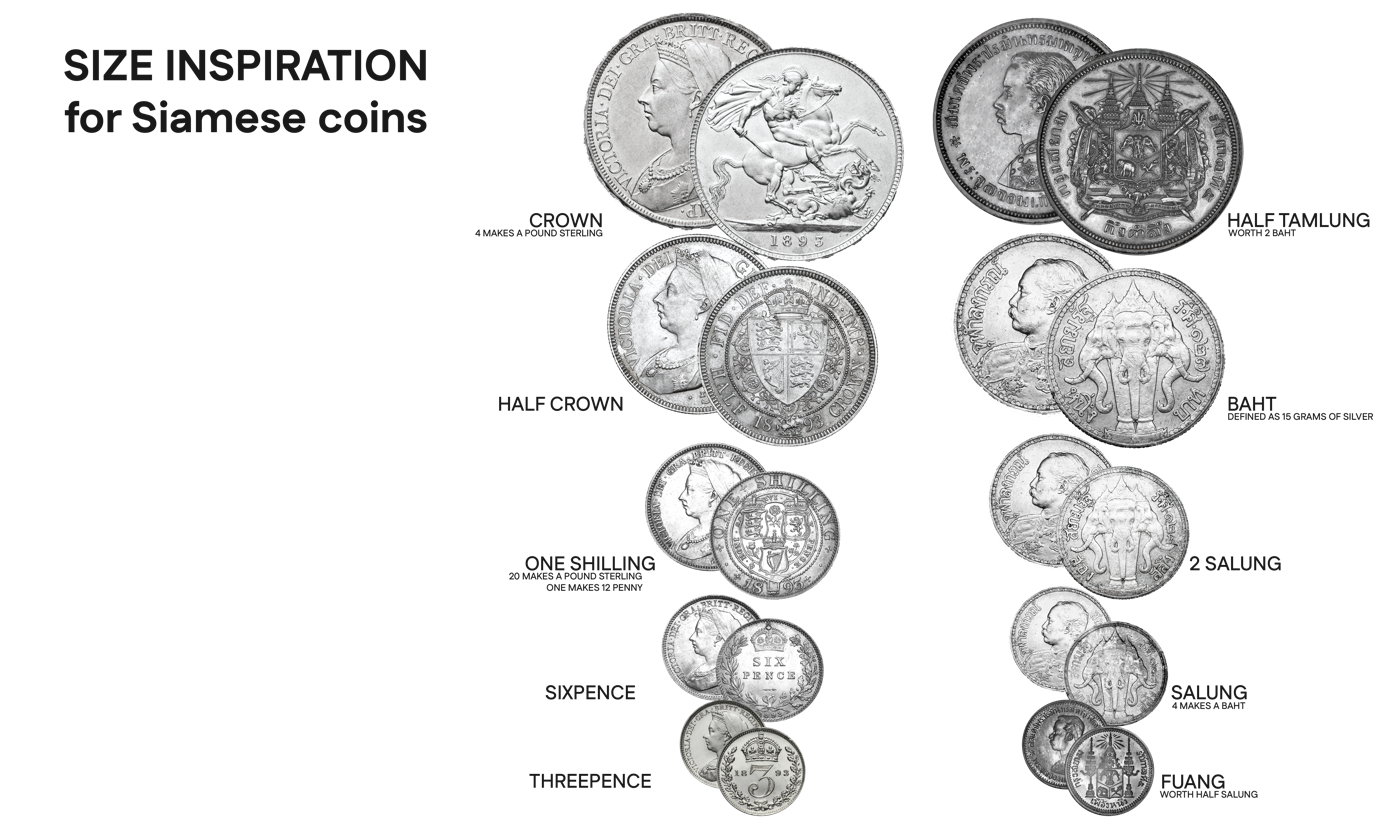

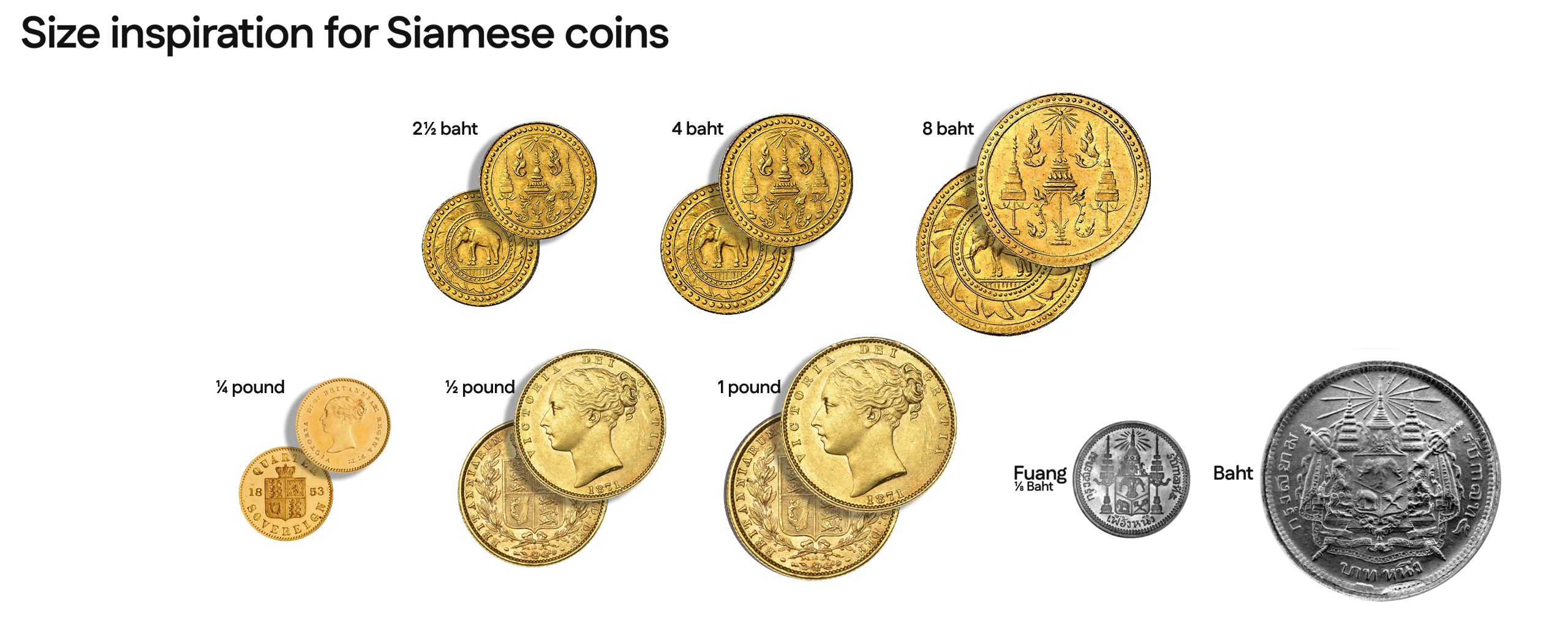

===== Excerpt on the sizes of these lower denominations =====
a new series modelled on the lines of the English copper money current at the time, and also minted in England. this was of 3 values, viz :~ 2 Atts (Sio or Pai), 1 Att, and 1/2 Att (Solot)

— The Siam Society, The Coins of the Bangkok Dynasty, 1782-1924, page 212

Table for Issue 5 - 1888 - Siam Devadhiraj Series
| Image | | Denomination | Weight | Dimensions | Mintages | Compositions | Inscriptions | | Date of Issue | Designer / Sculptor |
| Obverse | Reverse | Denomination | Weight | Dimensions | Mintages | Compositions | Obverse | Reverse | Date of Issue | Designer / Sculptor |
|---|---|---|---|---|---|---|---|---|---|---|
| | | Solot โสฬส 0 / 0 / ½ | 2.50 g | 19mm × 2mm | 10.24 million | Copper 95% Tin 4% Zinc 1% | Rama V's 2nd Portrait Chulalongkorn Rex จุฬาลงกรณ์ ป.ร. King Chula Chomklao of Siam พระจุลจอมเกล้าเจ้ากรุงสยาม | Guardian Deity of Siam's Portrait หนึ่งโสฬศ 1 solot ๑๑๘ (RS 118) | February 6 1888–1905 demonetized May 3, 1909 | Bank of Siam |
| | | At อัฐ 0 / 0 / 1 | 5.67 g | 24mm × 2mm | 30.72 million | Copper 95% Tin 4% Zinc 1% | Rama V's 2nd Portrait Chulalongkorn Rex จุฬาลงกรณ์ ป.ร. King Chula Chomklao of Siam พระจุลจอมเกล้าเจ้ากรุงสยาม | Guardian Deity of Siam's Portrait หนึ่งอัฐ 1 at ๑๒๒ (RS 122) | February 6 1888–1905 demonetized May 3, 1909 | Bank of Siam |
| | | Siao เสี้ยว 0 / 0 / 2 | 11.34 g | 30mm × 2mm | 10.24 million | Copper 95% Tin 4% Zinc 1% | Rama V's 2nd Portrait Chulalongkorn Rex จุฬาลงกรณ์ ป.ร. King Chula Chomklao of Siam พระจุลจอมเกล้าเจ้ากรุงสยาม | Guardian Deity of Siam's Portrait หนึ่งเซียว 1 siao ๑๒๒ (RS 122) | February 6 1888–1905 demonetized May 3, 1909 | Bank of Siam |

=== Decimal coinage ===
The decimalisation of the Thai baht came about at the end of the 19th century. The Minister of Treasury, Jayanta Mongkol, the Prince Mahisara Rajaharudaya, suggested to King Rama V that decimalisation would make counting easier and further modernise Siam. Initially, there would be one superunit, chang, and one subunit, at. with the baht being in the middle. In summary, 64 at = 1 baht = 1/80 chang. In reality, this was just a simplification of the old system, which was scrapped. In which, during the period of 1902–1908, Siam went back to the old system. Though in comparison, at is used as the subunit in Laos, compared to the satang in the Thai baht. The second attempt came at the end of Rama V's reign, where it was more widely accepted and put into effective use.

In 1897, the first coins denominated in satang were introduced, cupronickel 2 1/2, 5, 10, and 20 satang. However, 1 solot, 1, and 2 at coins were struck until 1905 and 1 fueang coins were struck until 1910. In 1908, holed 1, 5, and 10 satang coins were introduced, with the 1 satang in bronze and the 5 and 10 satang in nickel. The 1 and 2 salueng were replaced by 25 and 50 satang coins in 1915. In 1937, holed, bronze 1/2 satang were issued.

In 1941, a series of silver coins was introduced in denominations of 5, 10, and 20 satang, due to a shortage of nickel caused by World War II. The next year, tin coins were introduced for 1, 5, and 10 satang, followed by 20 satang in 1945 and 25 and 50 satang in 1946. In 1950, aluminium bronze 5, 10, 25, and 50 satang were introduced whilst, in 1957, bronze 5 and 10 satang were issued, along with 1-baht coins struck in an unusual alloy of copper, nickel, silver and zinc. Several Thai coins were issued for many years without changing the date. These include the tin 1942 1 satang and the 1950 5 and 10 satang, struck until 1973, the tin 1946 25 satang struck until 1964, the tin 50 satang struck until 1957, and the aluminium bronze 1957 5, 10, 25, and 50 satang struck until the 1970s. Cupronickel 1-baht coins were introduced in 1962 and struck without date change until 1982.

In 1972, cupronickel 5-baht coins were introduced, switching to cupronickel-clad copper in 1977. Between 1986 and 1988, a new coinage was introduced, consisting of aluminium 1, 5 and 10 satang, aluminium bronze 25 and 50 satang, cupronickel 1 baht, cupronickel-clad copper 5 baht and bimetallic 10 baht. Cupronickel-clad steel 2 baht were introduced in 2005.

==== Issue 6 – 1897 – Siam Anachak Series (transitional) ====
The old monetary system of Siam was based on a binary system that proved challenging for accounting purposes. This system initially consisted of three main units of currency: Chang, Baht, and Att. Under this system, there were 64 Att to 1 Baht and 80

Siam at the time of coin issue 6 (1897)

Baht to 1 Chang. Despite its widespread use, the system's complexity made it difficult to manage and calculate. Recognising the inefficiencies, the Minister of Treasury proposed to King Rama V that Siam's currency system should be decimalised. The proposal aimed to modernise the monetary system and align it with the decimal systems increasingly adopted by other countries at the time. King Rama V approved the transition to a decimal-based currency, which simplified accounting processes. The transition to a decimal currency system faced numerous challenges even before the new coins were issued. Notably, the word "Anachak" (อาณาจักร) was initially misspelled as "อานาจักร," causing controversy. King Rama V intervened, insisting that the most accurate phrasing should be "Siam Ratcha-Anachak" (สยามราชอาณาจักร; Kingdom of Siam). Despite the initial enthusiasm for the decimal system, the new coins struggled to gain popularity among the public. Many people were unfamiliar with the decimal system and preferred the traditional currency. Consequently, the new coins quickly faded from circulation, forcing the government to continue producing coins under the old system.

The production of coins from the old system persisted until RS 127 / BE 2451 / AD 1907. Ultimately, both pre-decimal coins and the early decimal coins were demonetised on May 17, RS 128 / BE 2452 / AD 1909. Citizens were given a grace period to exchange the demonetised coins for the new decimal currency, with the deadline set for May 16, RS 128 / BE 2452 / AD 1910. This gradual shift is shown in the fact that coins after the transition often switched between three calendar systems, the CS (Chulasakarat) system, the RS (Rattanakosin Sok) system, the BE (Buddhist Era / Phutthasakarat) system.

During the year 1897, it is presumed that Rama V had arranged this series to be made during his tour in Europe. This series was demonetised in 1908.

===== Royal Proclamation of 21st. August R. S. 117 (1898) : The proclamation of issuance of decimal currency =====
Formerly the subsidiary currency had the following values: 800 cowries equal one Fuang, 2 Fuang equal one Salung, 4 Salung equal one Tical. At present we are using the following copper coins as fractions of the Fuang: 4 Atts (Songpai), 2 Atts (pai), 1 Att, and ½ Att (Solot). These were struck on the obverse with the Royal Monogram ร.ป.ร. and the Little Crown above the letter ค, and also with the inscriptions Kingdom of Siam and Fifth Reign; on the reverse with a wreath of laurel leaves, in the middle of which appears the denomination of the particular coin and the date. Their issue was notified in the year of the Pig, Chula Era 1237, and the year of the Rat, Chula Era 1238.

There are also copper coins of another design for the 2 Atts (Pai), the Att, and the ½ Att (Solot) only. These have on the obverse His Majesty's effigy with the following inscription round the border: Chulalongkorn P. R. Phra Chula Chom Klao Chao Krung Siam, and on the reverse the figure representing 'Siam' holding a staff and seated on a shield. Their issue was notified in the year of the Pig, Chula Era 1249.

All these coins are valued in accordance with the original notation. In the accounts the figures of a sum are accordingly entered in three columns: Catties, Bahts, and Atts — 64 Atts, or 6,400 cowries, equalling one Tical and 80 Ticals one Catty, which is the unit. Now the system of keeping accounts is to be changed to a decimal one, reducing the number of columns to two only: Ticals and Satang. The value of a Satang is to be a hundredth part of a Tical, so that the summing up of a number of figures will be a much simpler task.

H. M. the King has therefore been pleased to command the mintage of subsidiary nickel coins of 4 denominations, all having on the obverse the image of the three-headed Elephant and the inscriptions Kingdom of Siam and Year 116, but on the reverse each denomination shall show its respective nominal value in letters and large numerals in the centre, thus twenty Satang, 20; ten Satang, 10; five Satang, 5; and two and a half Satang, 2½.

Being free from oxidisability and very portable, these nickel coins will form a more suitable currency than the copper ones. Both kinds of the latter will, however, still be legal token coins for their original nominal value, side by side with those of the Satang denominations, and the one may be freely demanded from the Treasury in exchange for the other at its full proportionate nominal value.

On and from the 21st. September R. S. 117 (1898), the nickel coins shall be current at their respective values mentioned above.

Proclaimed on 21st. August R. S. 117 (1898), being the 10,874th. day of the present Reign.

— Royal Siamese Government, Royal Proclamation of 21st. August R. S. 117 (1898)

Table for Issue 6 - 1897 - Siam Anachak Series
| Image | | Denomination | Weight | Dimensions | Mintages | Compositions | Inscriptions | | Date of Issue | Designer / Sculptor |
| Obverse | Reverse | Denomination | Weight | Dimensions | Mintages | Compositions | Obverse | Reverse | Date of Issue | Designer / Sculptor |
|---|---|---|---|---|---|---|---|---|---|---|
| | | 2.5 satang | 2.06 g | 16mm × 1.0mm | 3.12 million | Cupronickel | Erawan (Airavata) Portrait in Wreath Kingdom of Siam สยามอานาจักร ศก๑๑๖ (RS 116) | สองสตางค์ครึ่ง two and a half satang ๒ ๑/๒ 2½ H (Heaton Mint) | September 21, 1897 demonetized May 17, 1909 | Bank of Siam |
| | | 5 satang | 3.02 g | 20mm × 1.0mm | 3.81 million | Cupronickel | Erawan (Airavata) Portrait in Wreath Kingdom of Siam สยามอานาจักร ศก๑๑๖ (RS 116) | ห้าสตางค์ five satang ๕ 5 H (Heaton Mint) | September 21, 1897 demonetized May 17, 1909 | Bank of Siam |
| | | 10 satang | 4.00 g | 22mm × 1.0mm | 5.08 million | Cupronickel | Erawan (Airavata) Portrait in Wreath Kingdom of Siam สยามอานาจักร ศก๑๑๖ (RS 116) | สิบสตางค์ ten satang ๑๐ 10 H (Heaton Mint) | September 21, 1897 demonetized May 17, 1909 | Bank of Siam |
| | | 20 satang | 6.57 g | 25mm × 1.5mm | 5.08 million | Cupronickel | Erawan (Airavata) Portrait in Wreath Kingdom of Siam สยามอานาจักร ศก๑๑๖ (RS 116) | ยี่สิบสตางค์ twenty satang ๒๐ 20 H (Heaton Mint) | September 21, 1897 demonetized May 17, 1909 | Bank of Siam |

Siam at the time of coin issue 7 (1900)

==== Issue 7, 8, 9 – 1908 to 1937 – Chakra Series ====
This series is a widely minted and used series during the era of Rama V to Rama VIII. This series is also notable for being minted in many countries, in which the Siamese government would commission mints around the world to produce Thai coins and repatriate them back into the country and subsequently into circulation. The designs would vary between mints such as on the 1 satang coin, the font of the texts and the date would have slightly different positioning or texture.

===== On the Airavata emblem used in issue 7 to 9 =====
The Airavata Seal depicts a three-headed elephant adorned with royal regalia facing forward. Airavata is the mount of Indra. Originally, the seal was used as the emblem of the ruler known as Phra Indra Raja. Later, it became one of the royal seals of Siam. Some versions depicted Indra riding the elephant, while others showed only the elephant itself. The seal was used for stamping royal letters, proclamations, and official state documents.

The emblem was also associated with the Chakri Dynasty. During the reign of Mongkut, new Airavata royal seals were created for official use. Three versions were produced: a large seal, a medium seal, and a small seal.

According to the Royal Seal Act of 122 BE, the large royal seal was used for major royal proclamations and was placed between the Maha Ongkan royal seal and the Garuda royal seal. The medium royal seal was used for royal decrees and official accompanying documents, including the Suphannabat, Hiranyabat, and certificates. The Nine-Jewel Royal Seal was positioned between the Great Royal Decree seal and the Garuda seal.

The Airavata emblem later appeared on Siamese silver coins of the one-baht, two-salung, and one-salung denominations during the late reign of Chulalongkorn and continued into the reign of Vajiravudh.

===== Mints Involved =====
- Royal Thai Mint
- Heaton and Sons (The Mint Birmingham Limited)
- Japan Mint
- Royal Mint of Belgium
- United States Mint of Philadelphia

Following the issue of an earlier proclamation, accounts in Siam continued to be kept in ticals and att until after the enactment of the Gold Standard Act on 11 November 1908 (R.S. 127). After this date, the currency system was changed to a decimal system, and a new series of satang coins was introduced. At the same time, earlier nickel coins were withdrawn from circulation.

A new series of satang coins, minted in Europe, entered circulation in 1908 (R.S. 127) in connection with the Gold Standard Act. The series consisted of three denominations: 1, 5, and 10 satang. All three coins had a round central hole. Two denominations were struck in nickel, and one in copper. In 1909 (R.S. 128), a modification was made to the obverse design. The letters indicating the Ratanakosin Era (R.S.) were removed, leaving only the numerals of the date. This form continued into 1910. In 1913, the Buddhist Era replaced the Ratanakosin Era in coin dating. Coins issued thereafter bore dates such as B.E. 2456, corresponding to A.D. 1913. The coins were minted until 1937.

Table for Issue 7.1 - 1908 - Holed Coin Series
| Image | | Denomination | Weight | Dimensions | Mintages | Compositions | Inscriptions | | Date of Issue | Designer / Sculptor |
| Obverse | Reverse | Denomination | Weight | Dimensions | Mintages | Compositions | Obverse | Reverse | Date of Issue | Designer / Sculptor |
|---|---|---|---|---|---|---|---|---|---|---|
| | | 1 satang | 5.00 g | 22.5mm × 1mm | ~ 200 million | Bronze-copper-zinc | Chakra พ.ศ. ๒๔๗๐ (B.E. 2470) | Unalom Symbol สยามรัฐ ๑ สตางค์ Siamese State 1 satang | November 11, 1908 – 1937 | Bank of Siam |
| | | 1 satang | 5.00 g | 22.5mm × 1mm | ~ 23 million | Bronze-copper-zinc | Chakra พ.ศ. ๒๔๗๐ (B.E. 2470) | Unalom Symbol รัฐบารไทย ๑ สตางค์ Thai Government 1 satang | 1939 | Bank of Siam |
| | | 5 satang | 2.00 g | 17.5mm × 1mm | 5.08 million | Nickel | Chakra พ.ศ. ๒๔๗๐ (B.E. 2470) | Unalom Symbol สยามรัฐ ๕ สตางค์ Siamese State 5 satang | November 11, 1908 – 1937 | Bank of Siam |
| | | 10 satang | 3.50 g | 20mm × 1mm | 5.08 million | Nickel | Chakra พ.ศ. ๒๔๗๐ (B.E. 2470) | Unalom Symbol สยามรัฐ ๑๐ สตางค์ Siamese State 10 satang | November 11, 1908 – 1937 | Bank of Siam |
| | | 50 satang | 7.68 g | 25mm × 1mm | Unknown | Silver 90.00% | Rama V's 1st Portrait สมเด็จพระปรมินทรมหาจุฬาลงกรณ์ (His Majesty King Chulalongkorn) พระจุลจอมเกล้าเจ้าอยู่หัว (King Chulalongkorn) | Siamese State Seal กรุงสยาม Siam รัชกาลที่๕ 5th Reign ๕๐ สตางค์ 50 satang | 1908 | Bank of Siam |

==== Issue 7 – 1908 – Mustache Series ====
In 1908, the Siamese government commissioned the Monnaie de Paris mint to produce a new series of coins for Rama V. These coins were engraved by A. Patey and became the most popular coins to collect amongst the collector today, though with massive conterfeit problems. The coins' shipment were delayed and were shipped to Siam around the time of the passing of Rama V, and so the coins were never put in to circulation. With this, the mint saw fit that the designs were to be adapted to depict Rama VI.

Table for Issue 7.2 - 1908 - Mustache Series
| Image | | Denomination | Weight | Dimensions | Mintages | Compositions | Inscriptions | | Date of Issue | Designer / Sculptor |
| Obverse | Reverse | Denomination | Weight | Dimensions | Mintages | Compositions | Obverse | Reverse | Date of Issue | Designer / Sculptor |
|---|---|---|---|---|---|---|---|---|---|---|
| | | 25 satang | 3.75 g | 20mm × 1.3mm | Unknown | Silver 90.00% | Rama V's 3rd Portrait จุฬาลงกรณ์ สยามินทร์ Chulalongkorn, Lord of Siam | Erawan (Airavata) Portrait สยามรัฐ ร.ศ.๑๒๘; Siamese State RS 128 ๔๒ 42nd year of reign หนึ่ง สลึง 1 salueng | 1909 | Monnaie de Paris Henri-Auguste Patey |
| | | 50 satang | 7.5 g | 25.3mm × 1.3mm | Unknown | Silver 90.00% | Rama V's 3rd Portrait จุฬาลงกรณ์ สยามินทร์ Chulalongkorn, Lord of Siam | Erawan (Airavata) Portrait สยามรัฐ ร.ศ.๑๒๘; Siamese State RS 128 ๔๒ 42nd year of reign สอง สลึง 2 salueng | 1909 | Monnaie de Paris Henri-Auguste Patey |
| | | 1 baht | 16 g | 30mm × 3mm | 1.037 million | Silver 90.00% | Rama V's 3rd Portrait จุฬาลงกรณ์ สยามินทร์ Chulalongkorn, Lord of Siam | Erawan (Airavata) Portrait สยามรัฐ ร.ศ.๑๒๗; Siamese State RS 127 ๔๑ 41st year of reign หนึ่ง บาท 1 baht | 1908 | Monnaie de Paris Henri-Auguste Patey |

==== Issue 8 – 1913 – Erawan Series ====
These coins were all produced abroad, and they feature changes in year formatting and design differences over time. The coins were initially produced with the R.S. year system but transitioned to using the B.E. system from 1913 onwards. The 1 Baht coins were replaced with banknotes starting in 1918 due to the high cost of silver. The 2 Salung and 1 Salung coins experienced changes in metal composition due to fluctuating silver prices during World War I, and these coins have slight design variations based on these changes.

During issue, there were also various debasements of the silver content of these coins. Initially, the composition was 80% silver and 20% copper. In 1918, during World War I, silver prices surged, leading to a change in the composition to 65% silver and 35% copper. In 1919, the silver percentage dropped further to 50% silver and 50% copper. After the war, in 1919, the composition returned to 65% silver and 35% copper. In 1917, the price of silver rose and exceeded the face value of silver coins. The coins were then melted down and sold. The government solved this by changing the pure silver coin to alloy. Vajiravudh eventually forbade exports of Siamese coins. In 1918, the usage of 1-baht coins was nullified and 1-baht banknotes were introduced. Coins were recalled and kept as a national reserve.

Table for Issue 8 - 1913 - Erawan Series
| Image | | Denomination | Weight | Dimensions | Mintages | Compositions | Inscriptions | | Date of Issue | Designer / Sculptor |
| Obverse | Reverse | Denomination | Weight | Dimensions | Mintages | Compositions | Obverse | Reverse | Date of Issue | Designer / Sculptor |
|---|---|---|---|---|---|---|---|---|---|---|
| | | 25 satang | 3.75 g | 20mm × 1.3mm | ~ 18 million | Silver 80.00% 1915 Silver 65.0% 1916–1918 Silver 50.0% 1919 Silver 65.0% 1920–1921 | Rama VI's Portrait มหาวชิราวุธ สยามินทร์ Vajiravudh Lord of Siam | Erawan (Airavata) Portrait สยามรัฐ ๒๔๖๘; Siamese State BE 2468 หนึ่ง สลึง 1 salueng | 1909 | Monnaie de Paris Henri-Auguste Patey |
| | | 50 satang | 7.5 g | 25.3mm × 1.3mm | ~ 15 million | Silver 80.00% 1915 Silver 65.0% 1916–1918 Silver 50.0% 1919 Silver 65.0% 1920–1921 | Rama VI's Portrait มหาวชิราวุธ สยามินทร์ Vajiravudh Lord of Siam | Erawan (Airavata) Portrait สยามรัฐ ๒๔๖๘; Siamese State BE 2468 สอง สลึง 2 salueng | 1909 | Monnaie de Paris Henri-Auguste Patey |
| | | 1 baht | 16 g | 30mm × 3mm | ~ 37 million | Silver 90.00% | Rama VI's Portrait มหาวชิราวุธ สยามินทร์ Vajiravudh Lord of Siam | Erawan (Airavata) Portrait สยามรัฐ ๒๔๖๐; Siamese State BE 2460 หนึ่ง บาท 1 baht | 1909 | Monnaie de Paris Henri-Auguste Patey |

==== Issue 9 – 1929 – Regalia Elephant Series ====
Near the end of this issue of coins, the transition into decimal currency was completed. The Rama VII coin was produced in two denominations, 50 Satang and 25 Satang, and marked the transition from the old currency system of "สองสลึง" (two salung) and "หนึ่งสลึง" (one salung) to the new system using Satang as a unit of currency. Though, people today still refer to these denomination using the old terminology.

Table for Issue 9 - 1929 - Regalia Elephant Series
| Image | | Denomination | Weight | Dimensions | Mintages | Compositions | Inscriptions | | Date of Issue | Designer / Sculptor |
| Obverse | Reverse | Denomination | Weight | Dimensions | Mintages | Compositions | Obverse | Reverse | Date of Issue | Designer / Sculptor |
|---|---|---|---|---|---|---|---|---|---|---|
| | | 25 satang | 3.75 g | 20mm × 1.3mm | Unknown | Silver 65.00% | Rama VII's Portrait ประชาธิปก สยามินทร์ Prajadipok, Lord of Siam | Elephant in Regalia สยามรัฐ ๒๔๗๒; Siamese State BE 2472 ๒๕ ส.ต. 25 satang | March 11, 1930 | Bank of Siam |
| | | 50 satang | 7.5 g | 25.3mm × 1.3mm | 17.01 million | Silver 65.00% | Rama VII's Portrait ประชาธิปก สยามินทร์ Prajadipok, Lord of Siam | Elephant in Regalia สยามรัฐ ๒๔๗๒; Siamese State BE 2472 ๕๐ ส.ต. 50 satang | March 11, 1930 | Bank of Siam |

===== On the use of the Regalia Elephant seals =====
The White Elephant Seal standing on a pedestal appeared as the national emblem on Siamese silver coins of the 50 satang and 25 satang denominations during the reign of Prajadhipok in 1929 (B.E. 2472). This was the only time this emblem appeared on circulating coinage.

The emblem is believed to have originated from the Flag Act of Rattanakosin Era 118. One section of the law states"

"...During the reign of His Majesty King Mongkut, it was considered that the plain red flag used by Siamese merchant ships was inappropriate because it resembled the flags of other nations and was difficult to distinguish. It was therefore deemed proper to use a flag bearing an emblem similar to those used by royal ships. However, the Chakra symbol was considered too sacred for common people to use. His Majesty therefore issued a royal command to remove the Chakra, leaving only the white elephant on a red background for use by both royal and civilian vessels..."

This passage explains that during the reign of Mongkut, Siam adopted the white elephant emblem as a national symbol for maritime identification while reserving the sacred Chakra emblem for royal use only.

==== Issue 10 – 1937, 1941, 1942, 1945 – Kranok-lotus Series ====
Siam at the time of coin issue 10 (1945)

This series of coins is distinctive as it lacks the royal insignia and the state seal, which were commonly featured in earlier designs. This series also includes a 20 satang denomination; thus at one point the 25-satang and the 20-satang circulated at the same time. The half-satang was introduced in 1937 to address the issue of low-value currency units in Thailand. The value of 1 Satang was considered too high for certain low-priced items, causing economic hardship for the poor. Previously, 1 Baht could be exchanged for 128 Solot, but after the switch to Satang, 1 Baht was only equivalent to 100 Satang. The introduction of this coin aimed to make it easier for ordinary people to purchase items without the burden of inflated prices. The coin was produced only once and was discontinued soon afterwards. It was minted in Japan and first issued on July 12, 1937.

In 1942, a group of denominations switched material due to the costs of World War II: the 1-satang coin lost its hole in the middle and was made smaller.

Table for Issue 10.1 - 1937, 1941 - Kranok-Lotus Series
| Image | | Denomination | Weight | Dimensions | Mintages | Compositions | Inscriptions | | Date of Issue | Designer / Sculptor |
| Obverse | Reverse | Denomination | Weight | Dimensions | Mintages | Compositions | Obverse | Reverse | Date of Issue | Designer / Sculptor |
|---|---|---|---|---|---|---|---|---|---|---|
| | | 0.5 satang | 1.8 g | 19mm × 1.3mm | 12.09 million | Bronze | Chakra พ.ศ. ๒๔๘๐ (B.E. 2480) | Unalom Symbol ๑/๒ สตางค์ 1 satang สยามรัฐ Siamese State | July 12, 1937 | Bank of Siam |
| | | 1 satang | 3.5 g | 22.5mm × 1.3mm | 23.37 million | Bronze | Lotus Flower พ.ศ.๒๔๘๔ (BE 2484) | Kranok pattern ๑ สต. 1 satang รัฐบาลไทย Thai Government | January 8, 1941 | Bank of Siam |
| | | 5 satang | 1.5 g | 16.6mm × 1.3mm | 1.88 million | Silver 65.00% | Lotus Flower พ.ศ.๒๔๘๔ (BE 2484) | Kranok pattern ๕ สต. 5 satang รัฐบาลไทย Thai Government | January 8, 1941 | Bank of Siam |
| | | 10 satang | 2.5 g | 19mm × 1.3mm | 3.04 million | Silver 65.00% | Lotus Flower พ.ศ.๒๔๘๔ (BE 2484) | Kranok pattern ๑๐ สต. 10 satang รัฐบาลไทย Thai Government | January 8, 1941 | Bank of Siam |
| | | 20 satang | 3 g | 22mm × 1.3mm | 0.75 million | Silver 65.00% | Lotus Flower พ.ศ.๒๔๘๔ (BE 2484) | Kranok pattern ๒๐ สต. 20 satang รัฐบาลไทย Thai Government | June 20, 1942 | Bank of Siam |

Table for Issue 10.2 - 1942 - Kranok-Lotus Series
| Image | | Denomination | Weight | Dimensions | Mintages | Compositions | Inscriptions | | Date of Issue | Designer / Sculptor |
| Obverse | Reverse | Denomination | Weight | Dimensions | Mintages | Compositions | Obverse | Reverse | Date of Issue | Designer / Sculptor |
|---|---|---|---|---|---|---|---|---|---|---|
| | | 1 satang | 1.5 g | 15mm × 2mm | 140 million | Tin | Lotus Flower พ.ศ.๒๔๘๔ (BE 2484) | Kranok pattern ๑ สต. 1 satang รัฐบาลไทย Thai Government | April 17, 1942 | Bank of Siam |
| | | 5 satang | 3 g | 17.5mm × 2mm | 2.47 million | Tin | Lotus Flower พ.ศ.๒๔๘๔ (BE 2484) | Kranok pattern ๕ สต. 5 satang รัฐบาลไทย Thai Government | December 10, 1942 | Bank of Siam |
| | | 10 satang | 5 g | 20mm × 2mm | 1.80 million | Tin | Lotus Flower พ.ศ.๒๔๘๔ (BE 2484) | Kranok pattern ๑๐ สต. 10 satang รัฐบาลไทย Thai Government | January 12, 1945 | Bank of Siam |

Table for Issue 10.3 - 1945 - Kranok-Lotus Series
| Image | | Denomination | Weight | Dimensions | Mintages | Compositions | Inscriptions | | Date of Issue | Designer / Sculptor |
| Obverse | Reverse | Denomination | Weight | Dimensions | Mintages | Compositions | Obverse | Reverse | Date of Issue | Designer / Sculptor |
|---|---|---|---|---|---|---|---|---|---|---|
| | | 1 satang | 1.5 g | 15mm × 2mm | 11.9 million | Tin | Lotus Flower พ.ศ.๒๔๘๔ (BE 2484) | Kranok pattern ๑ สต. 1 satang รัฐบาลไทย Thai Government | 1944 | Bank of Siam |
| | | 5 satang | 3 g | 17.5mm × 2mm | 3.1 million | Tin | Lotus Flower พ.ศ.๒๔๘๔ (BE 2484) | Kranok pattern ๕ สต. 5 satang รัฐบาลไทย Thai Government | 1944 | Bank of Siam |
| | | 10 satang | 5 g | 20mm × 2mm | 6.59 million | Tin | Lotus Flower พ.ศ.๒๔๘๔ (BE 2484) | Kranok pattern ๑๐ สต. 10 satang รัฐบาลไทย Thai Government | 1944 | Bank of Siam |
| | | 20 satang | 6 g | 22mm × 2mm | 4.65 million | Tin | Lotus Flower พ.ศ.๒๔๘๔ (BE 2484) | Kranok pattern ๒๐ สต. 20 satang รัฐบาลไทย Thai Government | January 12, 1945 | Bank of Siam |

Siam at the time of coin issue 11 (1946)

==== Issue 11 – 1946 – Ananda Garuda Series ====
This was the first series minted in the reign of King Ananda Mahidol (Rama VIII), and it marked the return of national symbols, such as the Garuda emblem, which had been used as the national seal since the Ayutthaya period. This emblem, created during

the reign of King Chulalongkorn (Rama V), became the national seal to be used permanently, avoiding the need for a new one with each reign. There are two versions of this series minted in the same year, the young portrait and the teen portrait.

After World War 2, the government instructed the mint to start the production of coins depicting Rama VIII, since prior to this coins with no royal portrait were minted. These coins were made with pure tin. These coins were made with particularly low quality tin. During circulation, a lot of the coins from this series were damaged, lost, or rendered unusable. Even so, after the death of Rama VIII, the mint continue to produce this series of coins until the burial of Rama VIII, a tradition seen in the latest series of coins where new series were not introduced until after the coronation. Thus, this series of coins were used for 4 years after the passing of King Ananda Mahidol (Rama VIII).

While this series lacks a circulating 1 baht coin, a trial piece were produced but never released into circulation., the coin was 30.5 mm in diameter and made with tin. As a reference, this is the size of 5 baht coin up until issue 16 coins, or the last Rama 9 series of coins.

Table for Issue 11 - 1946 - Ananda Garuda Series
| Image | | Denomination | Weight | Dimensions | Mintages | Compositions | Inscriptions | | Date of Issue | Designer / Sculptor |
| Obverse | Reverse | Denomination | Weight | Dimensions | Mintages | Compositions | Obverse | Reverse | Date of Issue | Designer / Sculptor |
|---|---|---|---|---|---|---|---|---|---|---|
| | | 5 satang | 1.3 | 15 × 1.3 | 28.6 million | Tin 90.00% Copper 10.00% | Rama VIII's 1st Portrait อานันทมหิดล Ananda Mahidol รัชกาลที่ ๘ 8th Reign | Garuda รัฐบาลไทย Thai Government ๕ สต. 5 satang พ.ศ.๒๔๘๙ BE 2489 | 1946 | Bank of Siam |
| | | 10 satang | 1.8 | 17.7 × 1.3 | 53.5 million | Tin 90.00% Copper 10.00% | Rama VIII's 1st Portrait อานันทมหิดล Ananda Mahidol รัชกาลที่ ๘ 8th Reign | Garuda รัฐบาลไทย Thai Government ๑๐ สต. 10 satang พ.ศ.๒๔๘๙ BE 2489 | 1946 | Bank of Siam |
| | | 25 satang | 2.8 | 21 × 1.5 | 235 million | Tin 90.00% Copper 10.00% | Rama VIII's 1st Portrait อานันทมหิดล Ananda Mahidol รัชกาลที่ ๘ 8th Reign | Garuda รัฐบาลไทย Thai Government ๒๕ สต. 25 satang พ.ศ.๒๔๘๙ BE 2489 | 1946 | Bank of Siam |
| | | 50 satang | 5 | 25.5 × 1.5 | 19.7 million | Tin 90.00% Copper 10.00% | Rama VIII's 1st Portrait อานันทมหิดล Ananda Mahidol รัชกาลที่ ๘ 8th Reign | Garuda รัฐบาลไทย Thai Government ๕๐ สต. 50 satang พ.ศ.๒๔๘๙ BE 2489 | 1946 | Bank of Siam |

Alternative Posthumous 2nd Portrait of Rama 8 - 1946

===== On the use of the Garuda emblem =====
Vajiravudh ordered the creation of the Garuda Seal (Phra Khrut Pha) as the national royal seal. He reasoned that the royal seal used for endorsing royal signatures on important state documents had to be recreated every time a new reign began. Since the Garuda seal had served as a royal seal since the Ayutthaya Kingdom period, he considered it appropriate to establish it permanently as the national seal so that it would no longer need to be changed with each reign. As a result, the Garuda Seal became the national emblem of Siam from 1911 onward and has remained so to the present day.

The Garuda Seal symbolizes Narayana, regarded in Brahmanic tradition as a supreme deity. The Siamese king was viewed as a divine incarnation, and the Garuda, the mount of Narayana, was therefore adopted as the royal emblem. The seal was used as the national seal and for sealing royal correspondence and international treaties.

Over time, both the appearance and use of the seal evolved. Originally, the design depicted Narayana riding the Garuda, while the Garuda grasped naga serpents. This form was used for proclamations and was positioned to the right of the Airavata royal seal. Later, during the reign of Chulalongkorn, the King wished to use the Garuda emblem instead of the royal coat of arms as the seal accompanying the royal signature. He therefore ordered Narisara Nuwattiwong to redesign the emblem. The new version removed the figure of Narayana and retained only the Garuda. This design became known as the "Central Garuda Seal" and was used to accompany the royal signature.

The Garuda Seal first appeared on Thai banknotes during the reign of Vajiravudh on the first one-baht banknote series issued on October 3, 1918, under the supplementary Banknote Act.

The national Garuda emblem first appeared on Siamese coinage during the reign of Ananda Mahidol, and later appeared again on certain coins issued during the reign of Bhumibol Adulyadej.

==== Issue 12 – 1950 – State Ensign Series ====
Table for Issue 12 - 1950 - State Ensign Series
| Image | | Denomination | Weight | Dimensions | Mintages | Compositions | Inscriptions | | Date of Issue | Designer / Sculptor |
| Obverse | Reverse | Denomination | Weight | Dimensions | Mintages | Compositions | Obverse | Reverse | Date of Issue | Designer / Sculptor |
|---|---|---|---|---|---|---|---|---|---|---|
| | | 5 satang | 1.25 g | 15mm × 1mm | 21.8 million 6.48 million 46.44 million | Aluminium Bronze Tin Bronze | Rama IX's 1st Portrait ภูมิพลอดุลยเดช Bhumibol Adulyadej รัชกาลที่ ๙ 9th Reign | State Emblem รัฐบาลไทย Thai Government ๕ สต. 5 satang พ.ศ.๒๕๐๐ BE 2500 | March 18, 1957 (Al-Bz) December 8, 1954 (Sn) September 11, 1951 (Cu) | Obverse Fine Arts Department กรมศิลปากร Reverse San Tesasiri สานต์ เทศะศิริ |
| | | 10 satang | 1.75 g | 17.5mm × 1mm | 17.4 million 13.99 million 13.37 million | Aluminium Bronze Tin Bronze | Rama IX's 1st Portrait ภูมิพลอดุลยเดช Bhumibol Adulyadej รัชกาลที่ ๙ 9th Reign | State Emblem รัฐบาลไทย Thai Government ๑๐ สต. 10 satang พ.ศ.๒๕๐๐ BE 2500 | March 18, 1957 (Al-Bz) December 8, 1954 (Sn) September 11, 1951 (Cu) | Obverse Fine Arts Department กรมศิลปากร Reverse San Tesasiri สานต์ เทศะศิริ |
| | | 25 satang | 2.5 g | 20mm × 1mm | 634.65 million | Aluminium Bronze | Rama IX's 1st Portrait ภูมิพลอดุลยเดช Bhumibol Adulyadej รัชกาลที่ ๙ 9th Reign | State Emblem รัฐบาลไทย Thai Government ๒๕ สต. 25 satang พ.ศ.๒๕๐๐ BE 2500 | September 11, 1950 | Obverse Fine Arts Department กรมศิลปากร Reverse San Tesasiri สานต์ เทศะศิริ |
| | | 50 satang | 4.5 g | 23mm × 1.7mm | 460 million | Aluminium Bronze | Rama IX's 1st Portrait ภูมิพลอดุลยเดช Bhumibol Adulyadej รัชกาลที่ ๙ 9th Reign | State Emblem รัฐบาลไทย Thai Government ๕๐ สต. 50 satang พ.ศ.๒๕๐๐ BE 2500 | September 11, 1950 | Obverse Fine Arts Department กรมศิลปากร Reverse San Tesasiri สานต์ เทศะศิริ |
| | | 1 baht | 7.15 g | 27mm × 1.8mm | 3.14 million | Silver 3.00% | Rama IX's 1st Portrait ภูมิพลอดุลยเดช Bhumibol Adulyadej รัชกาลที่ ๙ 9th Reign | State Emblem รัฐบาลไทย Thai Government ๕๐ สต. 50 satang พ.ศ.๒๕๐๐ BE 2500 | January 28, 1957 | Obverse Fine Arts Department กรมศิลปากร Reverse Charoon Pienlikhit จรูญ เพียรลิขิต |
Baht switched standard to fiat
| | | 1 baht | 7.5 | 27mm × 1.8mm | 883 million | Cupronickel | Rama IX's 2nd Portrait ภูมิพลอดุลยเดช Bhumibol Adulyadej รัชกาลที่ ๙ 9th Reign | State Emblem รัฐบาลไทย Thai Government หนึ่ง บาท 1 baht พ.ศ.๒๕๐๕ BE 2505 | December 4, 1962 | Obverse San Tesasiri สานต์ เทศะศิริ Reverse San Tesasiri สานต์ เทศะศิริ |

==== Issue 13 – 1972 - Bhumibol Garuda Series ====
Table for Issue 13 - 1972 - Bhumibol Garuda Series
| Image | | Denomination | Weight | Dimensions | Mintages | Compositions | Inscriptions | | Date of Issue | Designer / Sculptor |
| Obverse | Reverse | Denomination | Weight | Dimensions | Mintages | Compositions | Obverse | Reverse | Date of Issue | Designer / Sculptor |
|---|---|---|---|---|---|---|---|---|---|---|
| | | 1 baht | 7 g | 25mm × 1.8mm | 248.9 million | Cupronickel | Rama IX's 3rd Portrait ภูมิพลอดุลยเดช Bhumibol Adulyadej รัชกาลที่ ๙ 9th Reign | State Emblem รัฐบาลไทย Thai Government ๑ บาท 1 baht พ.ศ.๒๕๑๗ BE 2517 | April 25, 1974 | Obverse Paithoonsri Deepanawong ไพฑูรย์ศรี ดีปานวงศ์ Reverse Pranee Klaycheewong ปราณี คล้ายเชื้อวงศ์ Montri Deepanawong มนตรี ดีปานวงศ์ |
| | | 5 baht | 9 g | 28mm × 2.0mm | 30 million | Cupronickel | Rama IX's 3rd Portrait ภูมิพลอดุลยเดช Bhumibol Adulyadej รัชกาลที่ ๙ 9th Reign | State Emblem รัฐบาลไทย Thai Government ๕ บาท 5 baht พ.ศ.๒๕๑๕ BE 2515 | February 8 1972 | Obverse San Tesasiri สานต์ เทศะศิริ Paitoon Muangsomboon ไพฑูรย์ เมืองสมบูรณ์ Reverse San Tesasiri สานต์ เทศะศิริ Paitoon Muangsomboon ไพฑูรย์ เมืองสมบูรณ์ |

==== Issue 14 – 1977 - Suphannahong-Rice Stalks Series ====
Table for Issue 14 - 1977 - Suphannahong-Rice Stalks Series
| Image | | Denomination | Weight | Dimensions | Mintages | Compositions | Inscriptions | | Date of Issue | Designer / Sculptor |
| Obverse | Reverse | Denomination | Weight | Dimensions | Mintages | Compositions | Obverse | Reverse | Date of Issue | Designer / Sculptor |
|---|---|---|---|---|---|---|---|---|---|---|
| | | 25 satang | 2.8 g | 20.5mm × 1.2mm | 183 million | Aluminium Bronze | Rama IX's 4th Portrait ประเทศไทย Thailand รัชกาลที่ ๙ 9th Reign | Rice Stalks ๒๕ สตางค์ 25 satang พ.ศ.๒๕๒๑ BE 2521 | October 15, 1977 | Obverse Supap Unaree สุภาพ อุ่นอารีย์ Montri Deepanawong มนตรี ดีปานวงศ์ Reverse Supap Unaree สุภาพ อุ่นอารีย์ Somchai Nuansakul สมชัย นวลสกุล |
| | | 50 satang | 4.9 g | 23mm × 1.2mm | 122 million | Aluminium Bronze | Rama IX's 4th Portrait ประเทศไทย Thailand รัชกาลที่ ๙ 9th Reign | Rice Stalks ๕๐ สตางค์ 50 satang พ.ศ.๒๕๒๓ BE 2523 | July 21, 1980 | Obverse Supap Unaree สุภาพ อุ่นอารีย์ Montri Deepanawong มนตรี ดีปานวงศ์ Reverse Supap Unaree สุภาพ อุ่นอารีย์ Somchai Nuansakul สมชัย นวลสกุล |
| | | 1 baht | 7 g | 25mm × 1.8mm | 506 million | Cupronickel | Rama IX's 4th Portrait ประเทศไทย Thailand รัชกาลที่ ๙ 9th Reign | Suphannahong Procession ๑ บาท 1 baht พ.ศ.๒๕๒๐ BE 2520 | December 21, 1977 | Obverse Supap Unaree สุภาพ อุ่นอารีย์ Montri Deepanawong มนตรี ดีปานวงศ์ Reverse Supap Unaree สุภาพ อุ่นอารีย์ Winai Chalokul วินัย ชโลกุล |
| | | 5 baht | 12 g | 30mm × 2.3mm | 100 million | Cupronickel-clad Copper | Rama IX's 4th Portrait สยามินทร์ King of Siam รัชกาลที่ ๙ 9th Reign | State Emblem ประเทศไทย Thailand ๕ บาท 5 baht พ.ศ.๒๕๒๒ BE 2522 | August 30, 1977 | Obverse Supap Unaree สุภาพ อุ่นอารีย์ Montri Deepanawong มนตรี ดีปานวงศ์ Reverse San Tesasiri สานต์ เทศะศิริ Montri Deepanawong มนตรี ดีปานวงศ์ |

==== Issue 15 – 1982 - Royal Palace Series ====
Table for Issue 15 - 1982 - Royal Palace Series
| Image | | Denomination | Weight | Dimensions | Mintages | Compositions | Inscriptions | | Date of Issue | Designer / Sculptor |
| Obverse | Reverse | Denomination | Weight | Dimensions | Mintages | Compositions | Obverse | Reverse | Date of Issue | Designer / Sculptor |
|---|---|---|---|---|---|---|---|---|---|---|
| | | 1 baht | 7 g | 25mm × 1.8mm | 257 million | Cupronickel | Rama IX's 5th Portrait ภูมิพลอดุลยเดช Bhumibol Adulyadej รัชกาลที่ ๙ 9th Reign | Grand Palace ประเทศไทย Thailand ๑ บาท 1 baht พ.ศ.๒๕๒๕ BE 2525 | 1982 | Bank of Thailand |
| | | 5 baht | 12 g | 30mm × 2.3mm | 26.4 million | Cupronickel-clad Copper | Rama IX's 5th Portrait ภูมิพลอดุลยเดช Bhumibol Adulyadej รัชกาลที่ ๙ 9th Reign | State Emblem ประเทศไทย (Thailand ๕ บาท 5 baht พ.ศ.๒๕๒๕ BE 2525 | 1982 | Bank of Thailand |

==== Issue 16 – 1987, 1988, 2005, 2008 - Temple Series ====
Table for Issue 16 - 1987, 1988, 2005, 2008 - Temple Series
Issue 16 coins (Rama IX)
| Value | Dimensions (mm) | Weight (g) | Mintage | Composition | Inscription, description | | Date of issue |
| Value | Dimensions (mm) | Weight (g) | Mintage | Composition | Obverse | Reverse | Date of issue |
|---|---|---|---|---|---|---|---|
Limited-Circulation Coin
| 1 satang | 15mm × 1mm | 0.5 g | 1.99 million | Aluminium-manganese Alloy | Rama IX's 5th Portrait ภูมิพลอดุลยเดช Bhumibol Adulyadej รัชกาลที่ ๙ 9th Reign | Phra That Hariphunchai ประเทศไทย (Thailand) ๑ สตางค์ 1 (1 satang) พ.ศ.๒๕๔๗ (BE 2547) | 1987 |
| 1 satang | 15mm × 1mm | 0.5 g | 90,000 | Aluminium | Rama IX's 7th Portrait ภูมิพลอดุลยเดช Bhumibol Adulyadej รัชกาลที่ ๙ 9th Reign | Phra That Hariphunchai ประเทศไทย (Thailand) ๑ สตางค์ 1 (1 satang) พ.ศ.๒๕๔๗ (BE 2547) | 2008 |
| 5 satang | 16mm × 1mm | 0.6 g | 2.87 million | Aluminium-manganese Alloy | Rama IX's 5th Portrait ภูมิพลอดุลยเดช Bhumibol Adulyadej รัชกาลที่ ๙ 9th Reign | Wat Phra Pathommachedi ประเทศไทย (Thailand) ๕ สตางค์ 5 (5 satang) พ.ศ.๒๕๓๘ (BE 2538) | 1987 |
| 5 satang | 16.5mm × 1mm | 0.6 g | 90,000 | Aluminium | Rama IX's 7th Portrait ภูมิพลอดุลยเดช Bhumibol Adulyadej รัชกาลที่ ๙ 9th Reign | Wat Phra Pathommachedi ประเทศไทย (Thailand) ๕ สตางค์ 5 (5 satang) พ.ศ.๒๕๓๘ (BE 2538) | 2008 |
| 10 satang | 17.5mm × 1mm | 0.8 g | 2.43 million | Aluminium-manganese Alloy | Rama IX's 5th Portrait ภูมิพลอดุลยเดช Bhumibol Adulyadej รัชกาลที่ ๙ 9th Reign | Wat Phra That Choeng Chum ประเทศไทย (Thailand) ๑๐ สตางค์ 10 (10 satang) พ.ศ.๒๕๔๒ (BE 2542) | 1987 |
| 10 satang | 17.5mm × 1mm | 0.8 g | 90,000 | Aluminium | Rama IX's 7th Portrait ภูมิพลอดุลยเดช Bhumibol Adulyadej รัชกาลที่ ๙ 9th Reign | Wat Phra That Choeng Chum ประเทศไทย (Thailand) ๑๐ สตางค์ 10 (10 satang) พ.ศ.๒๕๔๒ (BE 2542) | 2008 |
Full-Circulation Coin
| 25 satang | 16mm × 1.35mm | 1.9 g | 2.082 billion | Aluminium bronze | Rama IX's 5th Portrait ภูมิพลอดุลยเดช Bhumibol Adulyadej รัชกาลที่ ๙ 9th Reign | Wat Phra Mahathat ประเทศไทย (Thailand) ๒๕ สตางค์ 25 (25 satang) พ.ศ.๒๕๔๗ (BE 2547) | 1987 |
| 25 satang | 16mm × 1.35mm | 1.9 g | 2.161 billion | Copper-plated steel | Rama IX's 7th Portrait ภูมิพลอดุลยเดช Bhumibol Adulyadej รัชกาลที่ ๙ 9th Reign | Wat Phra Mahathat ประเทศไทย (Thailand) ๒๕ สตางค์ 25 (25 satang) พ.ศ.๒๕๔๗ (BE 2547) | 2008 |
| 50 satang | 18mm × 1.35mm | 2.4 g | 1.544 billion | Aluminium bronze | Rama IX's 5th Portrait ภูมิพลอดุลยเดช Bhumibol Adulyadej รัชกาลที่ ๙ 9th Reign | Doi Suthep Chedi ประเทศไทย (Thailand) ๕๐ สตางค์ 50 (50 satang) พ.ศ.๒๕๓๘ (BE 2538) | 1987 |
| 50 satang | 18mm × 1.35mm | 2.4 g | 1.453 billion | Copper-plated steel | Rama IX's 7th Portrait ภูมิพลอดุลยเดช Bhumibol Adulyadej รัชกาลที่ ๙ 9th Reign | Doi Suthep Chedi ประเทศไทย (Thailand) ๕๐ สตางค์ 50 (50 satang) พ.ศ.๒๕๓๘ (BE 2538) | 2008 |
| 1 baht | 20mm × 1.5mm | 3.4 g | 9.116 billion | Aluminium bronze | Rama IX's 5th Portrait ภูมิพลอดุลยเดช Bhumibol Adulyadej รัชกาลที่ ๙ 9th Reign | Wat Phra Kaew ประเทศไทย (Thailand) ๑ บาท (1 baht) พ.ศ.๒๕๔๒ (BE 2542) | 1987 |
| 1 baht | 20mm × 1.5mm | 3 g | 7.089 billion | Nickel-plated steel | Rama IX's 7th Portrait ภูมิพลอดุลยเดช Bhumibol Adulyadej รัชกาลที่ ๙ 9th Reign | Wat Phra Kaew ประเทศไทย (Thailand) ๑ บาท (1 baht) พ.ศ.๒๕๔๒ (BE 2542) | 2008 |
| 2 baht | 22mm × 2.8mm | 7.5 g | Cupronickel-clad copper | | Many designs since all of the issues prior to 1996 are commemorative | | 1985–1996 (special circ. issues) |
| 2 baht | 21.75mm × 1.8mm | 4.4 g | 399.9 million | Nickel-plated steel | Rama IX's 6th Portrait ภูมิพลอดุลยเดช Bhumibol Adulyadej รัชกาลที่ ๙ 9th Reign | Golden Mount ประเทศไทย (Thailand) ๒ บาท 2 (2 baht) พ.ศ.๒๕๔๙ (BE 2549) | 2005 |
| 2 baht | 21.75mm × 1.5mm | 4 g | 1.712 billion | Aluminium bronze | Rama IX's 7th Portrait ภูมิพลอดุลยเดช Bhumibol Adulyadej รัชกาลที่ ๙ 9th Reign | Golden Mount ประเทศไทย (Thailand) ๒ บาท 2 (2 baht) พ.ศ.๒๕๔๙ (BE 2549) | 2008 |
| 5 baht | 24mm × 2.2mm | 7.5 g | 44 million | Cupronickel-clad copper | Rama IX's 5th Portrait ภูมิพลอดุลยเดช Bhumibol Adulyadej รัชกาลที่ ๙ 9th Reign | Suphannahong Procession ประเทศไทย (Thailand) ๕ บาท (5 baht) พ.ศ.๒๕๓๐ (BE 2530) | 1987 |
| 5 baht | 24mm × 2.2mm | 7.5 g | 1.622 billion | Cupronickel-clad copper | Rama IX's 5th Portrait ภูมิพลอดุลยเดช Bhumibol Adulyadej รัชกาลที่ ๙ 9th Reign | Wat Benchamabophit ประเทศไทย (Thailand) ๕ บาท (5 baht) พ.ศ.๒๕๓๐ (BE 2530) | 1988 |
| 5 baht | 24mm × 1.75mm | 6 g | 2.018 billion | Cupronickel-clad copper | Rama IX's 7th Portrait ภูมิพลอดุลยเดช Bhumibol Adulyadej รัชกาลที่ ๙ 9th Reign | Wat Benchamabophit ประเทศไทย (Thailand) ๕ บาท (5 baht) พ.ศ.๒๕๓๐ (BE 2530) | 2008 |
| 10 baht | 26mm × 2.15mm | 8.5 g | 1.082 billion | Aluminium bronze (centre); Cupronickel (ring) | Rama IX's 5th Portrait ภูมิพลอดุลยเดช Bhumibol Adulyadej รัชกาลที่ ๙ 9th Reign | Wat Arun ประเทศไทย(Thailand) ๑๐ บาท 10 (10 baht) พ.ศ.๒๕๔๕ (BE 2545) | 1988 |
| 10 baht | 26mm × 2.15mm | 8.5 g | 826.9 million | Aluminium bronze (centre); Cupronickel (ring) | Rama IX's 7th Portrait ภูมิพลอดุลยเดช Bhumibol Adulyadej รัชกาลที่ ๙ 9th Reign | Wat Arun ประเทศไทย(Thailand) ๑๐ บาท 10 (10 baht) พ.ศ.๒๕๔๕ (BE 2545) | 2008 |

=== Current coinage ===
The current coin series is the 17th issue.

In 2008, in the 16th issue, the Ministry of Finance and the Royal Thai Mint announced the 2009 coin series, which included changes in materials to reduce production costs as well as an update of the image on the obverse to a more recent portrait of the king. The two-baht coin, confusingly similar in colour and size to the one-baht coin, was changed from nickel-clad low-carbon steel to aluminium bronze. New two-baht coin was the first of the new series released on 3 February 2009, followed by the satang coins in April, a five-baht coin in May, a ten-baht coin in June, and a one-baht coin in July 2009.

In 2018, the Royal Thai Mint and the Ministry of Finance issued a new series of general circulation coins, featuring the same standard specifications, but feature a portrait of its current king, Vajiralongkorn.

==== Issue 16 – 1987, 2009 ====
Issue 16 coins (Rama IX)
| Value | Technical parameters | | | Description | | Date of first minting |
| Value | Diameter | Mass | Composition | Obverse | Reverse | Date of first minting |
|---|---|---|---|---|---|---|
| 1 satang^{1} | 15 mm | 0.5 g | 97.5% Al, 2.5% Mg | King Bhumibol Adulyadej | Wat Phra That Hariphunchai, Lamphun | 1987 |
| 1 satang^{1} | 15 mm | 0.5 g | 99% Aluminium | King Bhumibol Adulyadej | Wat Phra That Hariphunchai, Lamphun | 2008 |
| 5 satang^{1} | 16 mm | 0.6 g | 97.5% Al, 2.5% Mg | King Bhumibol Adulyadej | Wat Phra Pathom Chedi, Nakhon Pathom | 1987 |
| 5 satang^{1} | 16.5 mm | 0.6 g | 99% Aluminium | King Bhumibol Adulyadej | Wat Phra Pathom Chedi, Nakhon Pathom | 2008 |
| 10 satang^{1} | 17.5 mm | 0.8 g | 97.5% Al, 2.5% Mg | King Bhumibol Adulyadej | Wat Phra That Choeng Chum, Sakon Nakhon | 1987 |
| 10 satang^{1} | 17.5 mm | 0.8 g | 99% Aluminium | King Bhumibol Adulyadej | Wat Phra That Choeng Chum, Sakon Nakhon | 2008 |
| 25 satang | 16 mm | 1.9 g | Aluminium bronze | King Bhumibol Adulyadej | Wat Phra Mahathat, Nakhon Si Thammarat | 1987 |
| 25 satang | 16 mm | 1.9 g | Copperplated steel | King Bhumibol Adulyadej | Wat Phra Mahathat, Nakhon Si Thammarat | 2008 |
| 50 satang | 18 mm | 2.4 g | Aluminium bronze | King Bhumibol Adulyadej | Wat Phra That Doi Suthep, Chiang Mai | 1987 |
| 50 satang | 18 mm | 2.4 g | Copperplated steel | King Bhumibol Adulyadej | Wat Phra That Doi Suthep, Chiang Mai | 2008 |
| 1 baht | 20 mm | 3.4 g | Cupronickel | King Bhumibol Adulyadej | Wat Phra Kaew, Bangkok | 1987 |
| 1 baht | 20 mm | 3 g | Nickelplated steel | King Bhumibol Adulyadej | Wat Phra Kaew, Bangkok | 2008 |
| 2 baht | 21.75 mm | 4.4 g | Nickelplated low-carbon steel | King Bhumibol Adulyadej | Wat Saket, Bangkok | 2005 |
| 2 baht | 21.75 mm | 4 g | Aluminium bronze | King Bhumibol Adulyadej | Wat Saket, Bangkok | 2008 |
| 5 baht | 24 mm | 7.5 g | Cupronickel-clad copper | King Bhumibol Adulyadej | Wat Benchamabophit, Bangkok | 1988 |
| 5 baht | 24 mm | 6 g | Cupronickel-clad copper | King Bhumibol Adulyadej | Wat Benchamabophit, Bangkok | 2008 |
| 10 baht | 26 mm | 8.5 g | Center plug: Aluminium bronze Outer ring: Cupronickel | King Bhumibol Adulyadej | Wat Arun, Bangkok | 1988 |
| 10 baht | 26 mm | 8.5 g | Center plug: Aluminium bronze Outer ring: Cupronickel | King Bhumibol Adulyadej | Wat Arun, Bangkok | 2008 |

==== Issue 17 – 2018 - Rama X Monogram Series ====
Table for Issue 17 - 2018 - Rama X Monogram Series
| Image | | Value | Composition | Description | | Date of first minting |
| Obverse | Reverse | Value | Composition | Obverse | Reverse | Date of first minting |
|---|---|---|---|---|---|---|
| | | 1 satang^{1} | Aluminium | King Vajiralongkorn | Monogram of Vajiralongkorn | 2018 |
| | | 5 satang^{1} | Aluminium | King Vajiralongkorn | Monogram of Vajiralongkorn | 2018 |
| | | 10 satang^{1} | Aluminium | King Vajiralongkorn | Monogram of Vajiralongkorn | 2018 |
| | | 25 satang | Copperplated steel | King Vajiralongkorn | Monogram of Vajiralongkorn | 2018 |
| | | 50 satang | Copperplated steel | King Vajiralongkorn | Monogram of Vajiralongkorn | 2018 |
| | | 1 baht | Nickelplated steel | King Vajiralongkorn | Monogram of Vajiralongkorn | 2018 |
| | | 2 baht | Aluminium bronze | King Vajiralongkorn | Monogram of Vajiralongkorn | 2018 |
| | | 5 baht | Cupronickel-clad copper | King Vajiralongkorn | Monogram of Vajiralongkorn | 2018 |
| | | 10 baht | Center plug: Aluminium bronze Outer ring: Cupronickel | King Vajiralongkorn | Monogram of Vajiralongkorn | 2018 |

=== Remarks ===
1. The 1, 5 and 10 satang are used only internally between banks and are not in circulation.
2. Older coins, some of which are still in circulation, had only Thai numerals, but newer designs also have Arabic numerals.
3. The standard-issue 10-baht coin has, at the 12 o'clock position on the reverse, raised dots corresponding to Braille cell dot 1 and dots 2–4–5, which correspond to the number 10.
4. 10-baht coins are very similar to 2-euro coins in size, shape and weight, and are likewise bi-metallic, although they are worth only about €0.25. Vending machines not equipped with up-to-date coin detectors might therefore accept them as €2 coins or old Italian 500 lira coins as well.
5. Many commemorative 1-, 2-, 5- and 10-baht coins have been made for special events. There also are 20-, 50-, 100-baht base metal commemorative coins and higher-denomination precious metal coins as well.

In February 2010 the Treasury Department of Thailand stated that it has been planning a new circulation 20-baht coin.

=== Monarch's profile ===
==== Rama IV ====
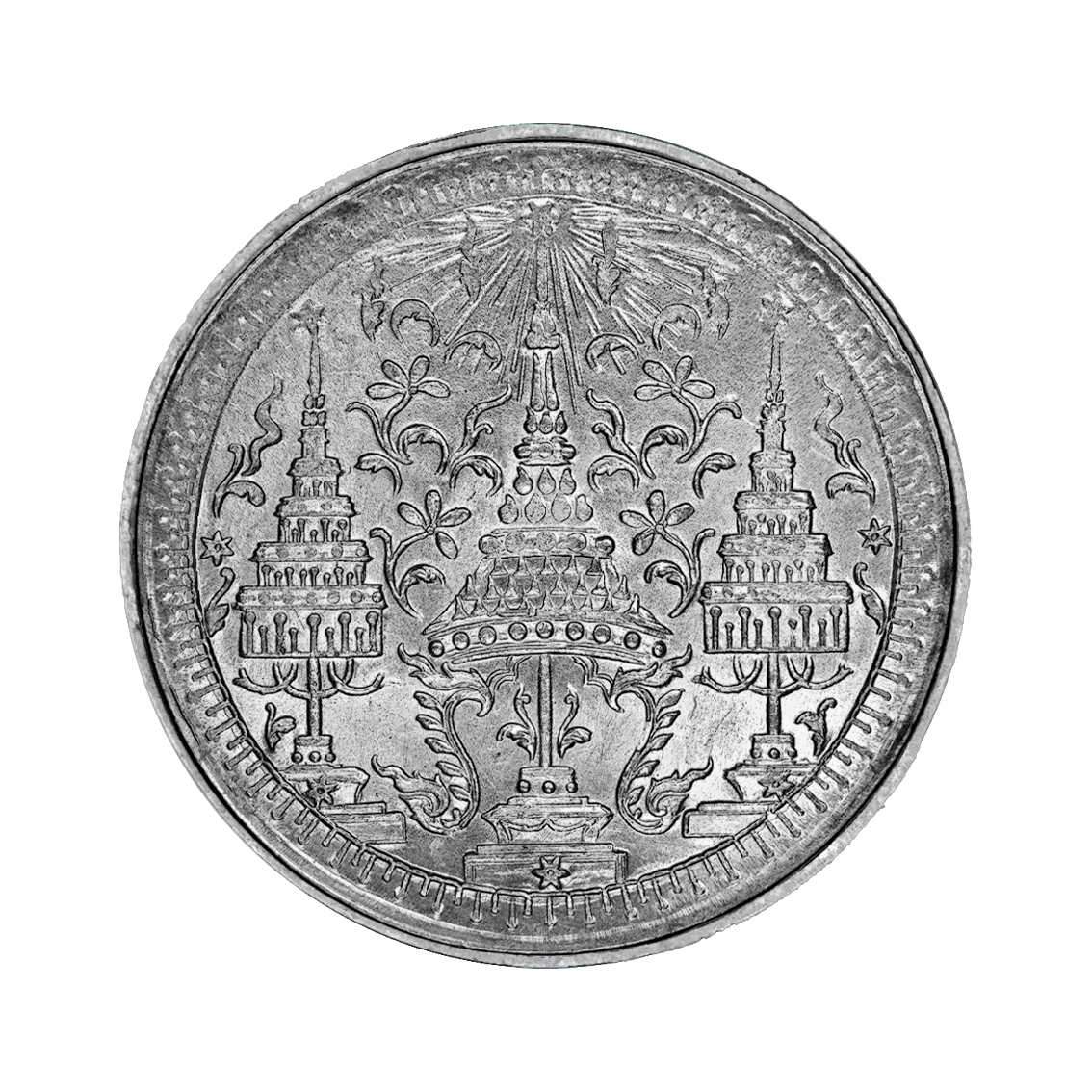
1857 - Rama 4 1st Seal

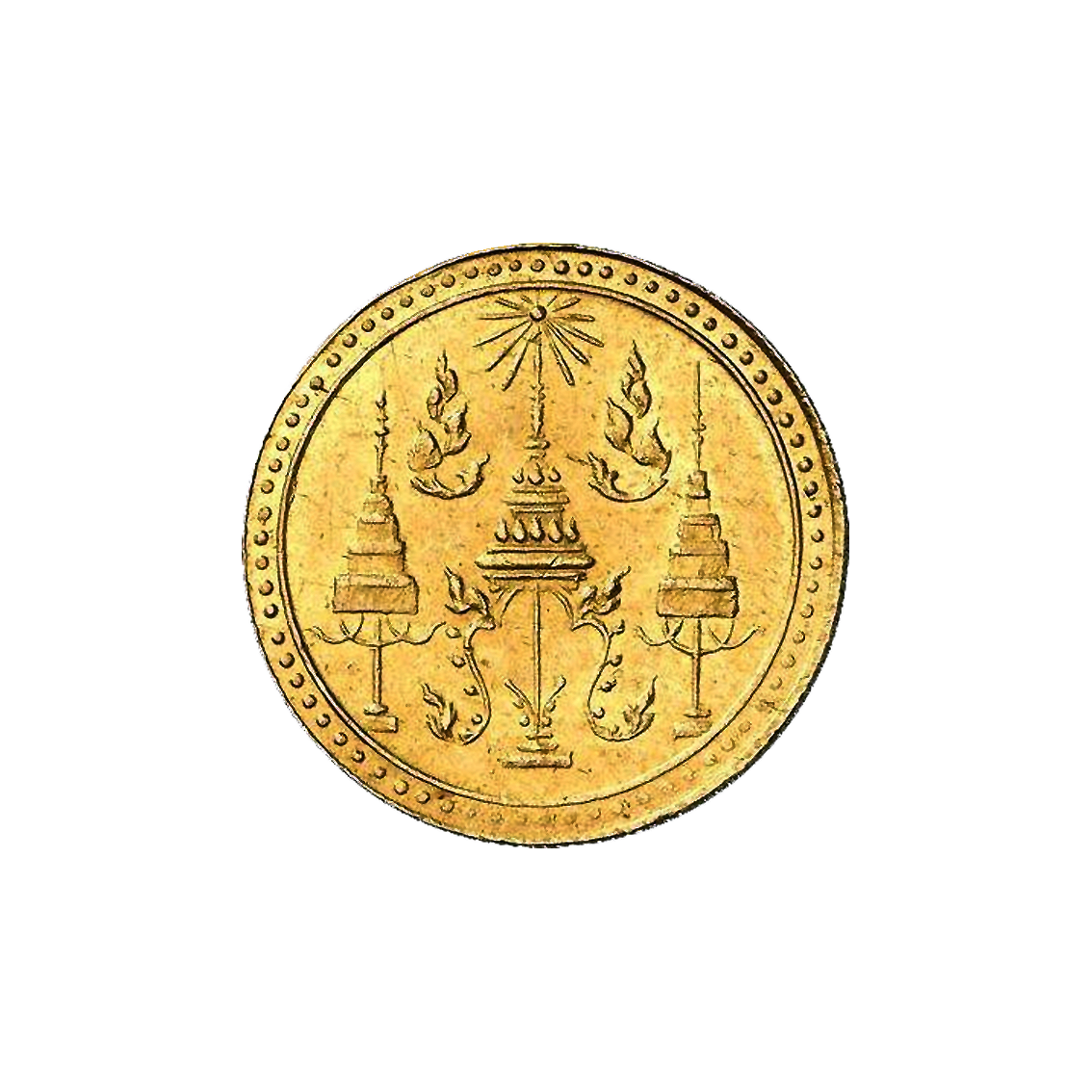
1862 - Rama 4 2nd Seal

==== Rama V ====
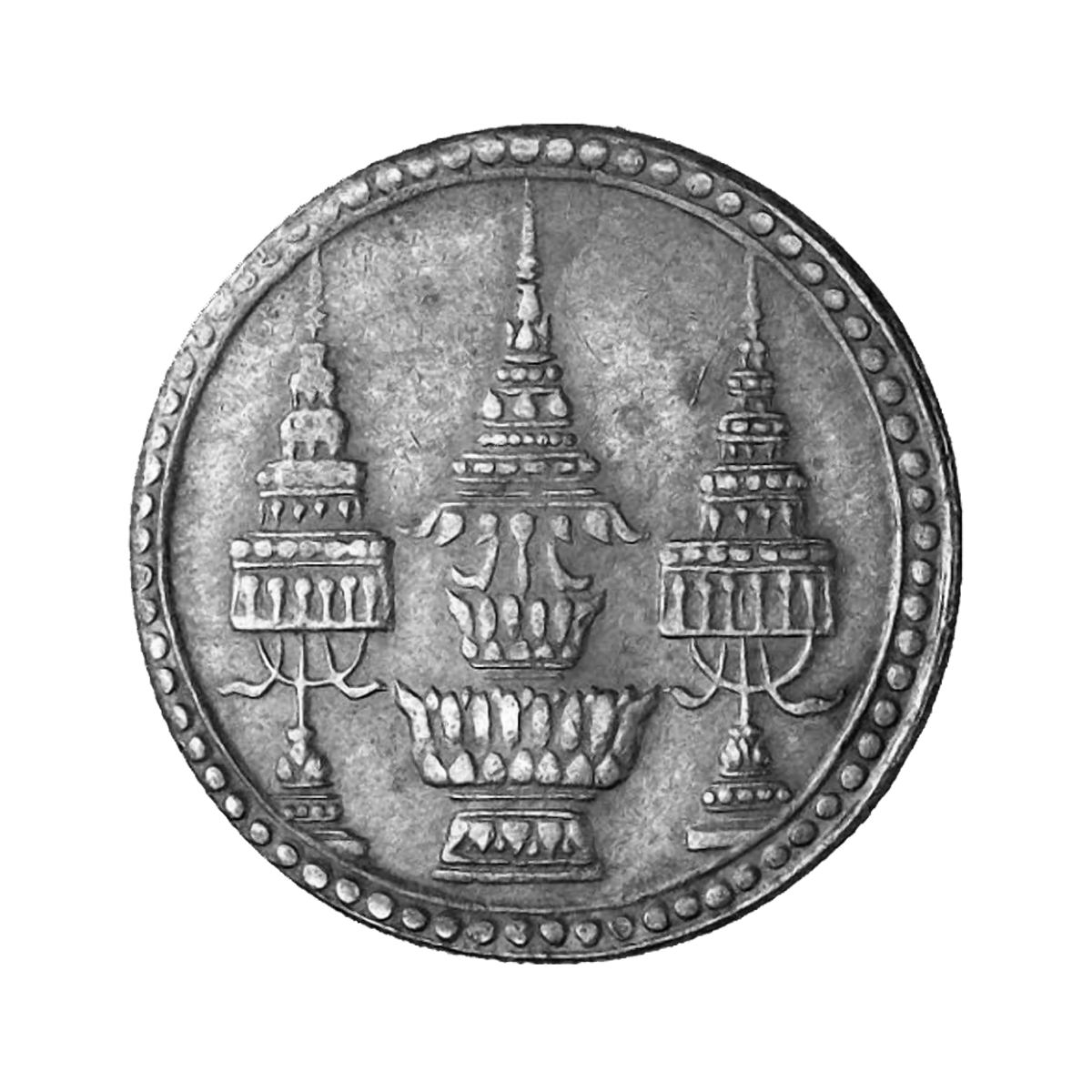
1869 - Rama 5 Seal

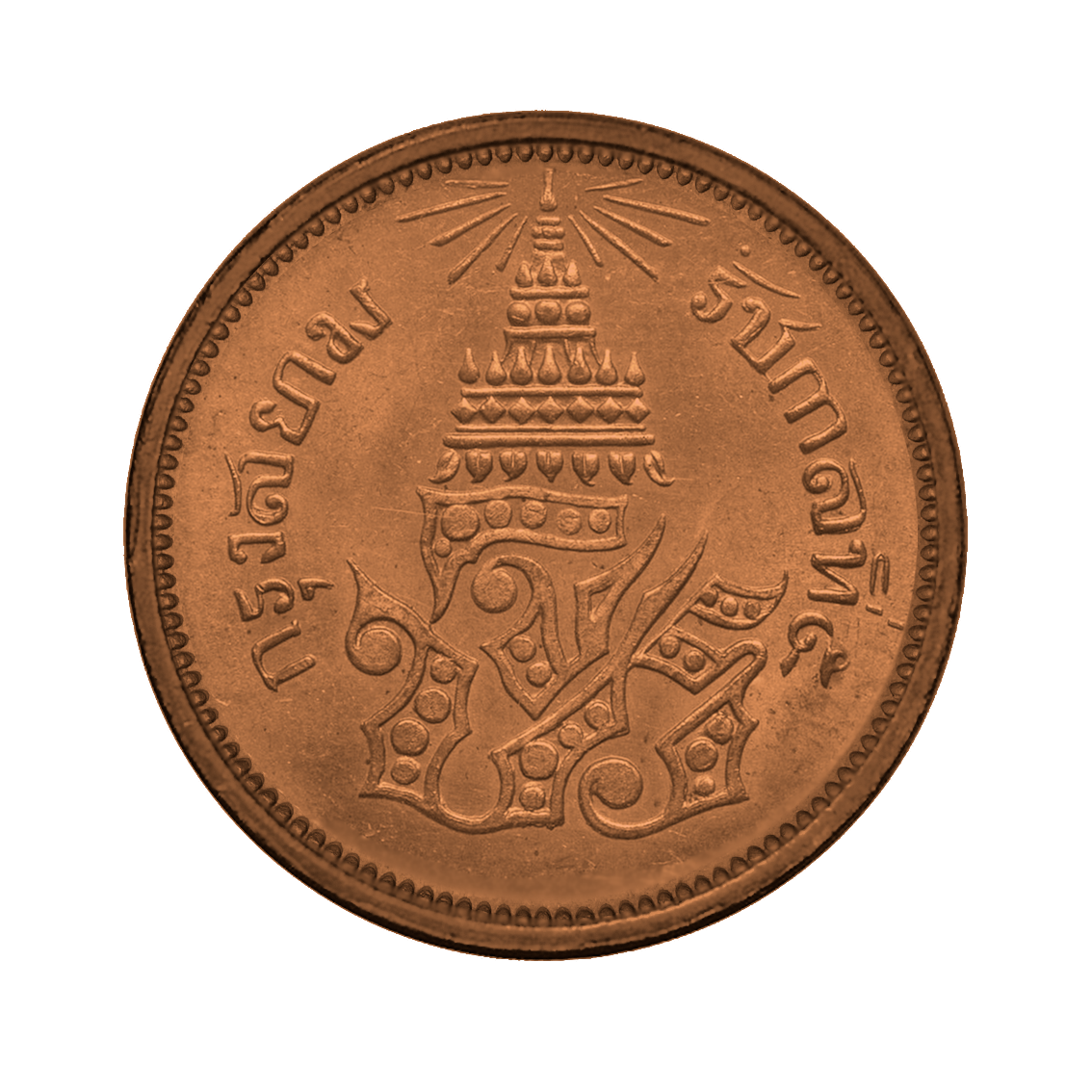
1875 - Rama 5 Monogram

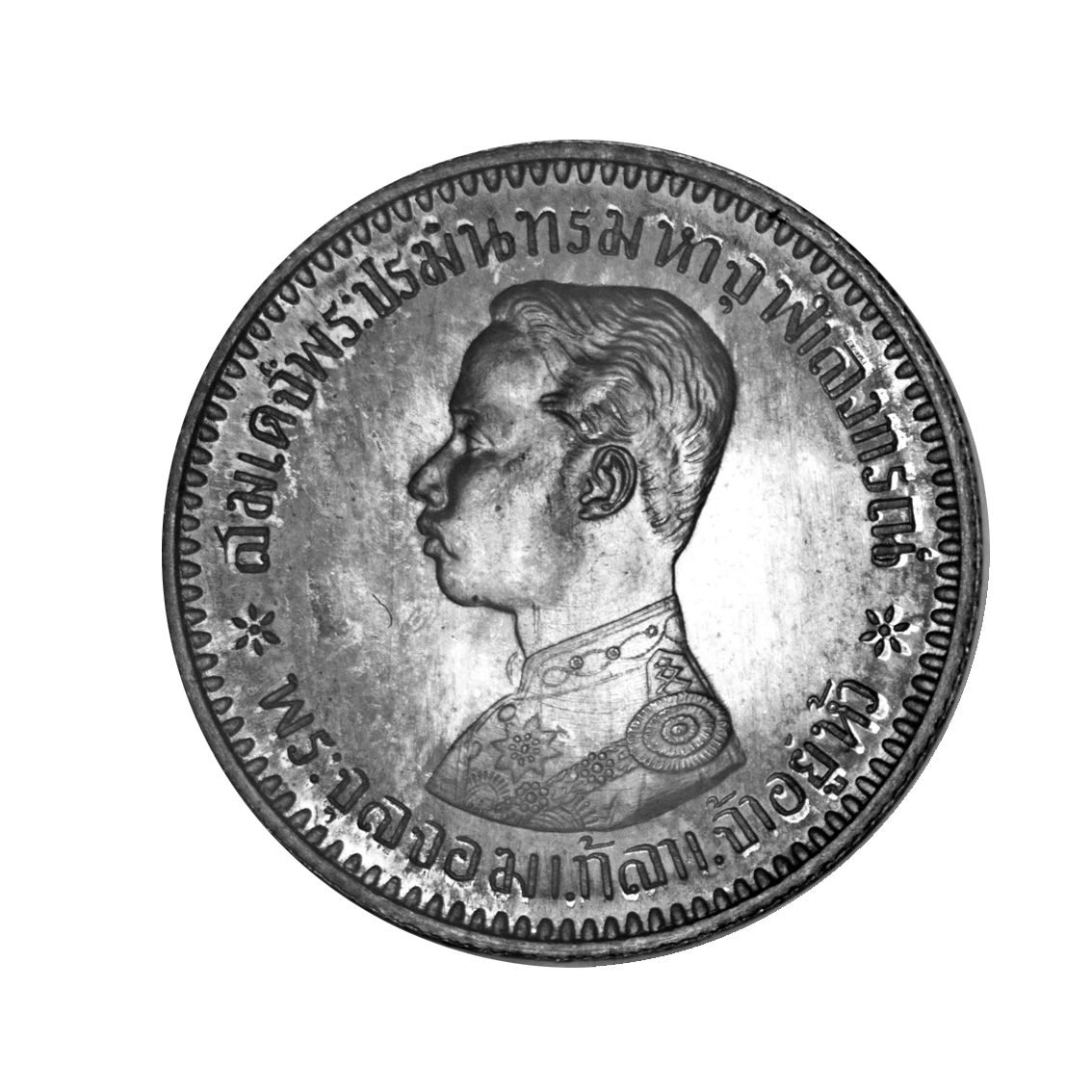
1875 - Rama 5 1st Portrait

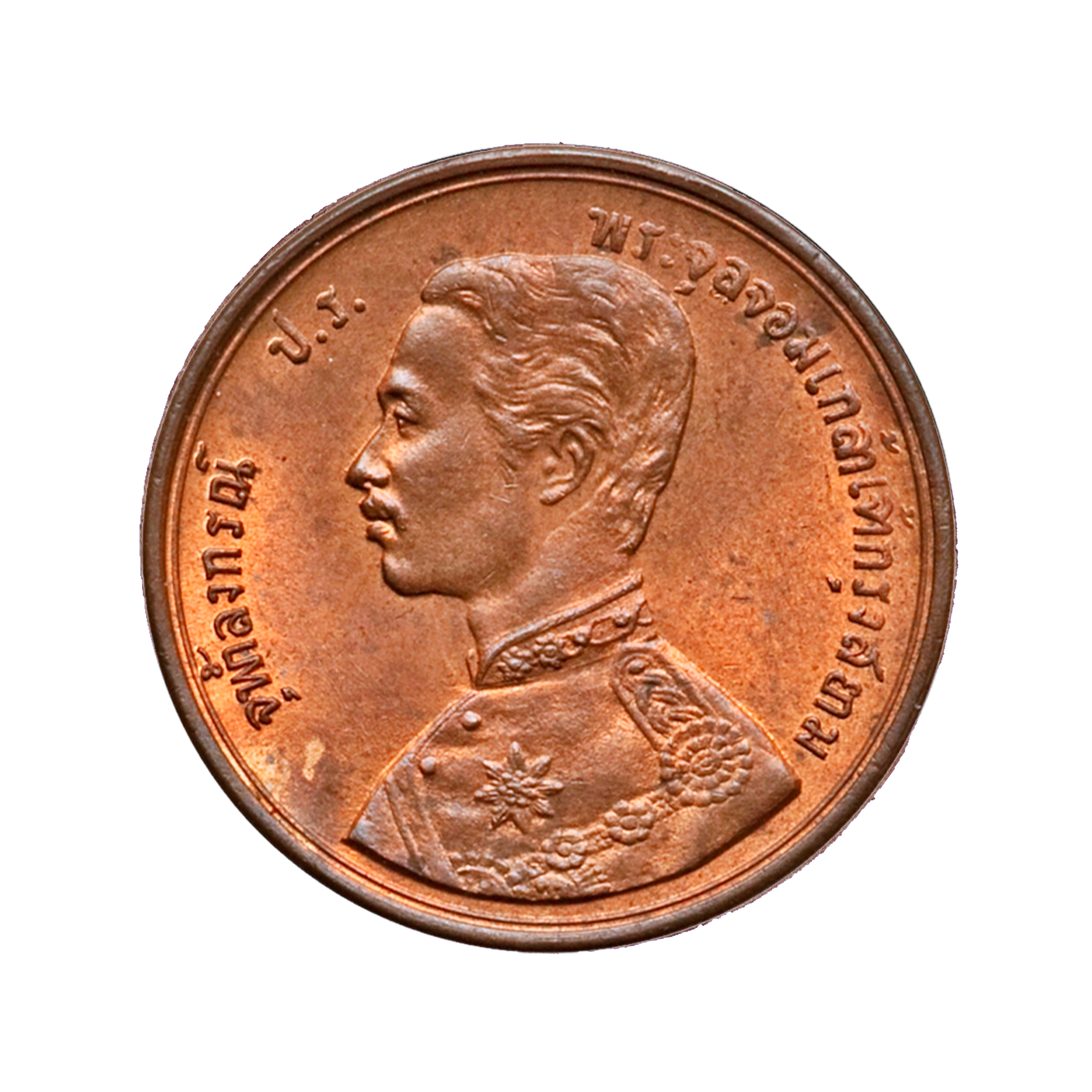
1888 - Rama 5 2nd Portrait

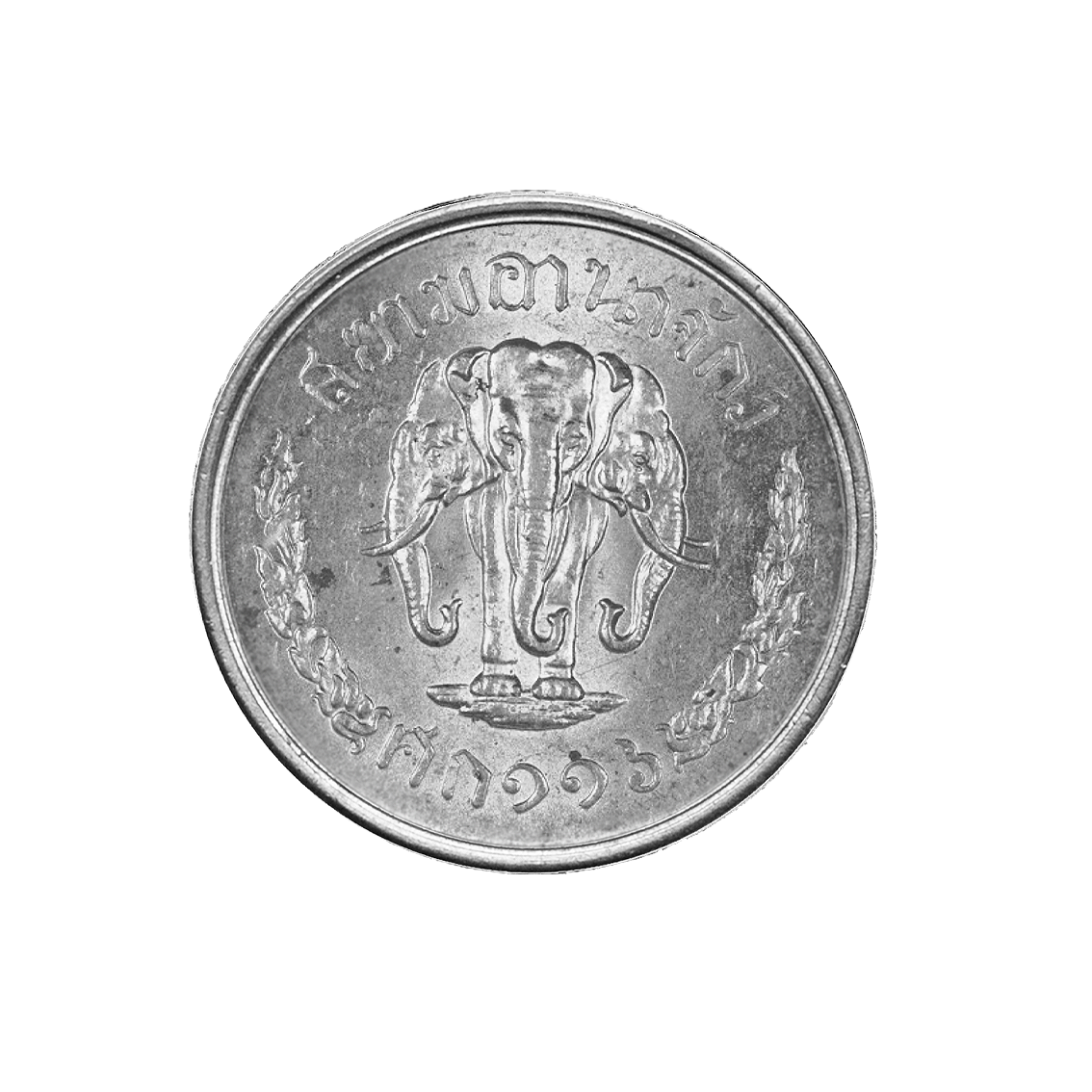
1897 - National Seal

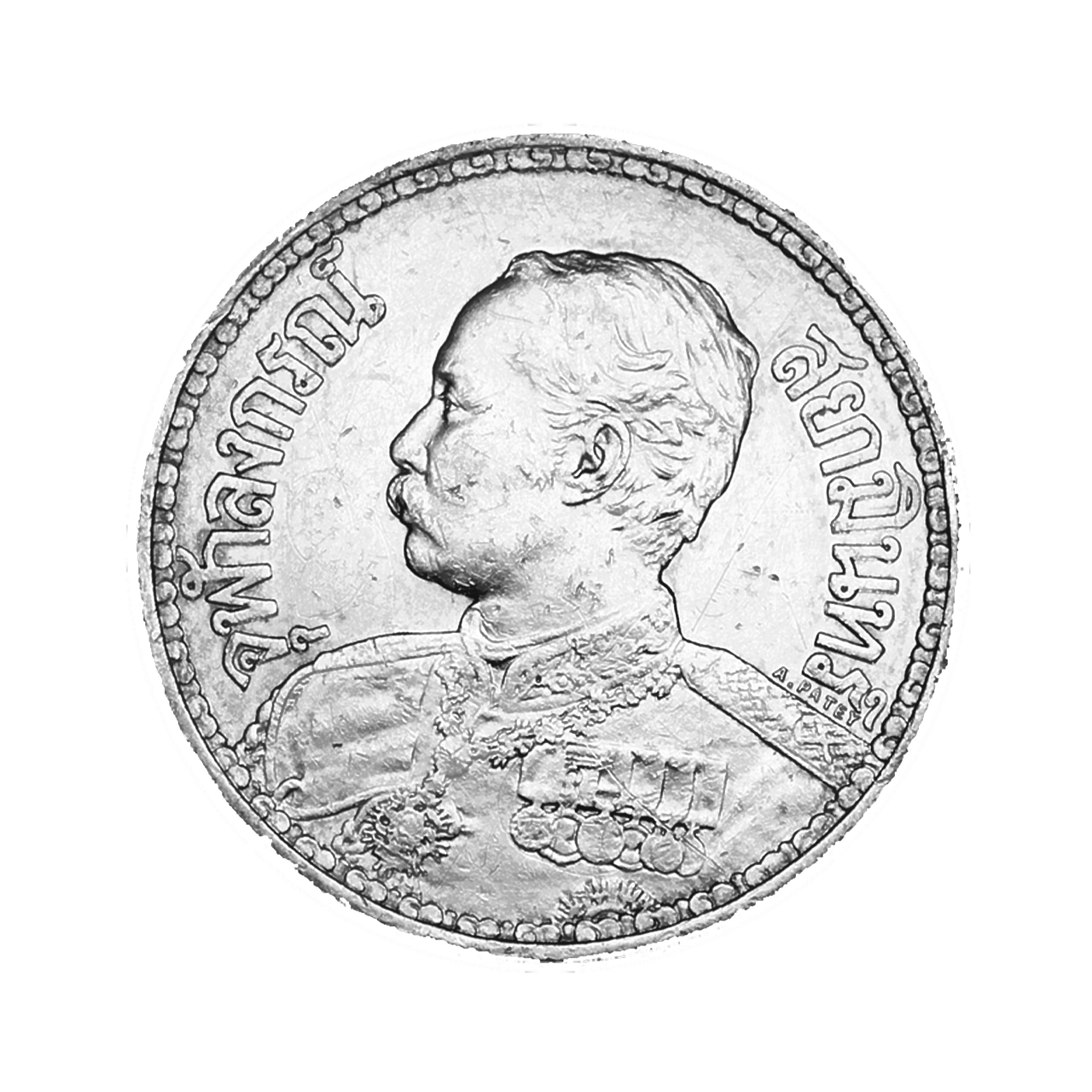
1908 - Rama 5 3rd Portrait

==== Rama VI, VII, and VIII ====
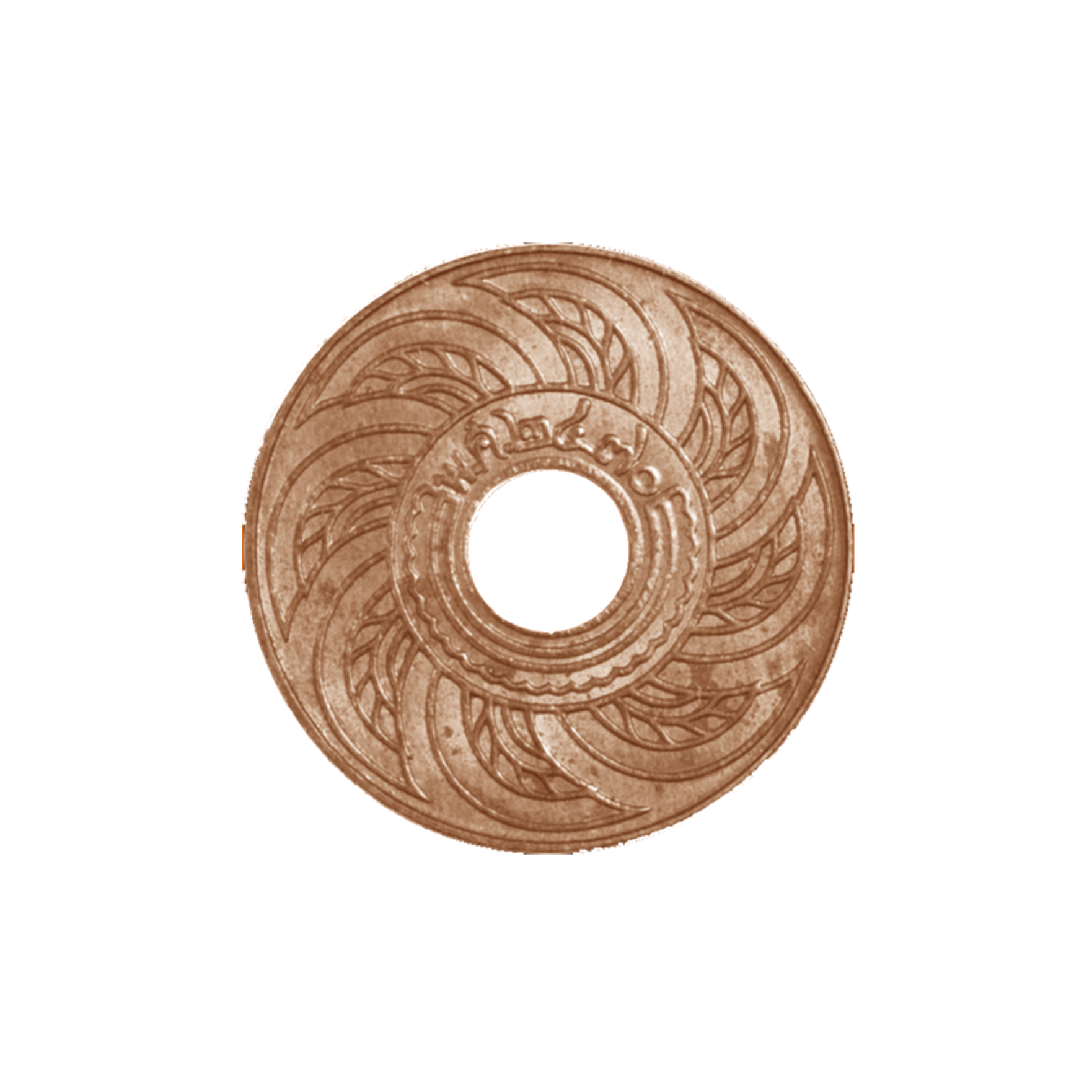
1910 - Chakra

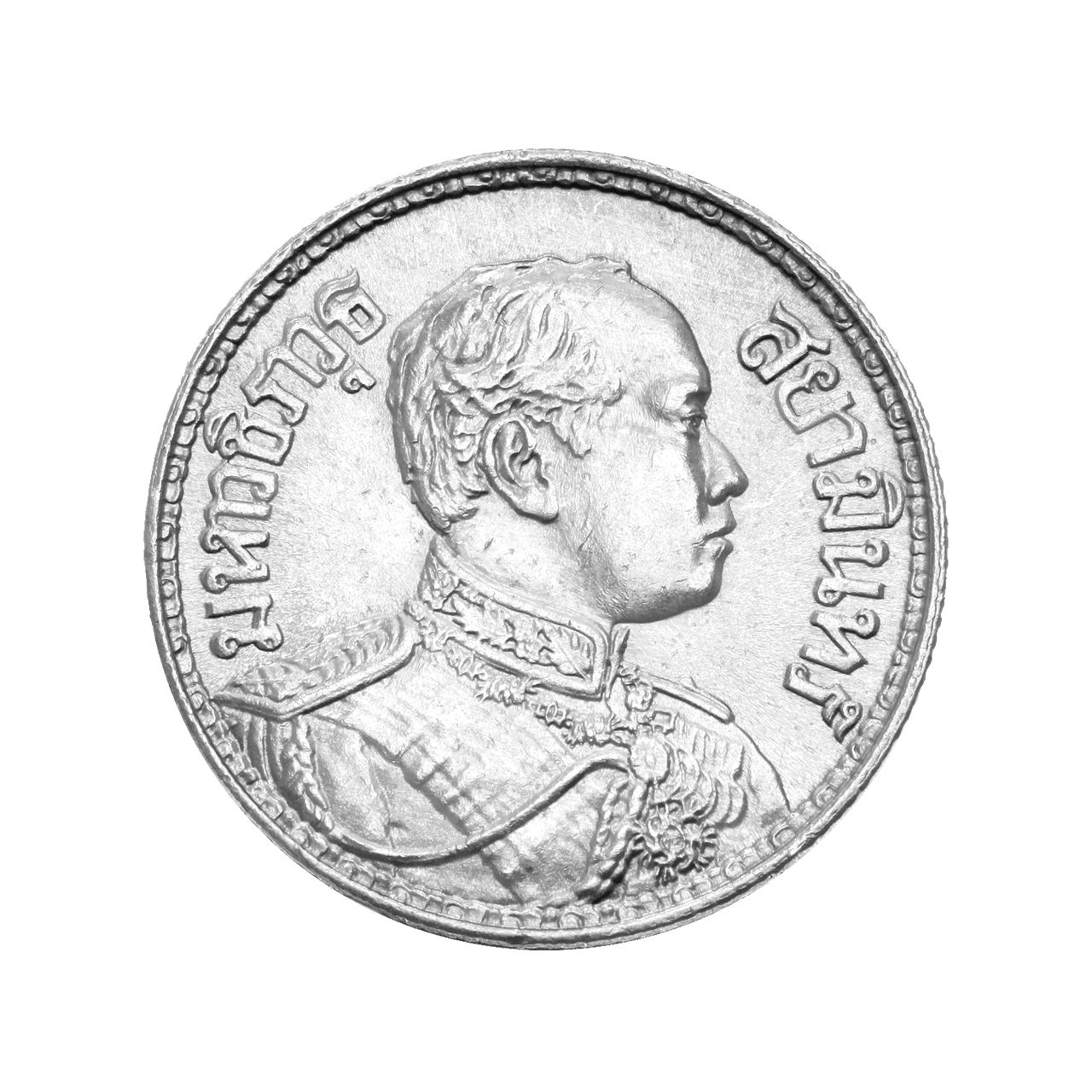
1913 - Rama 6

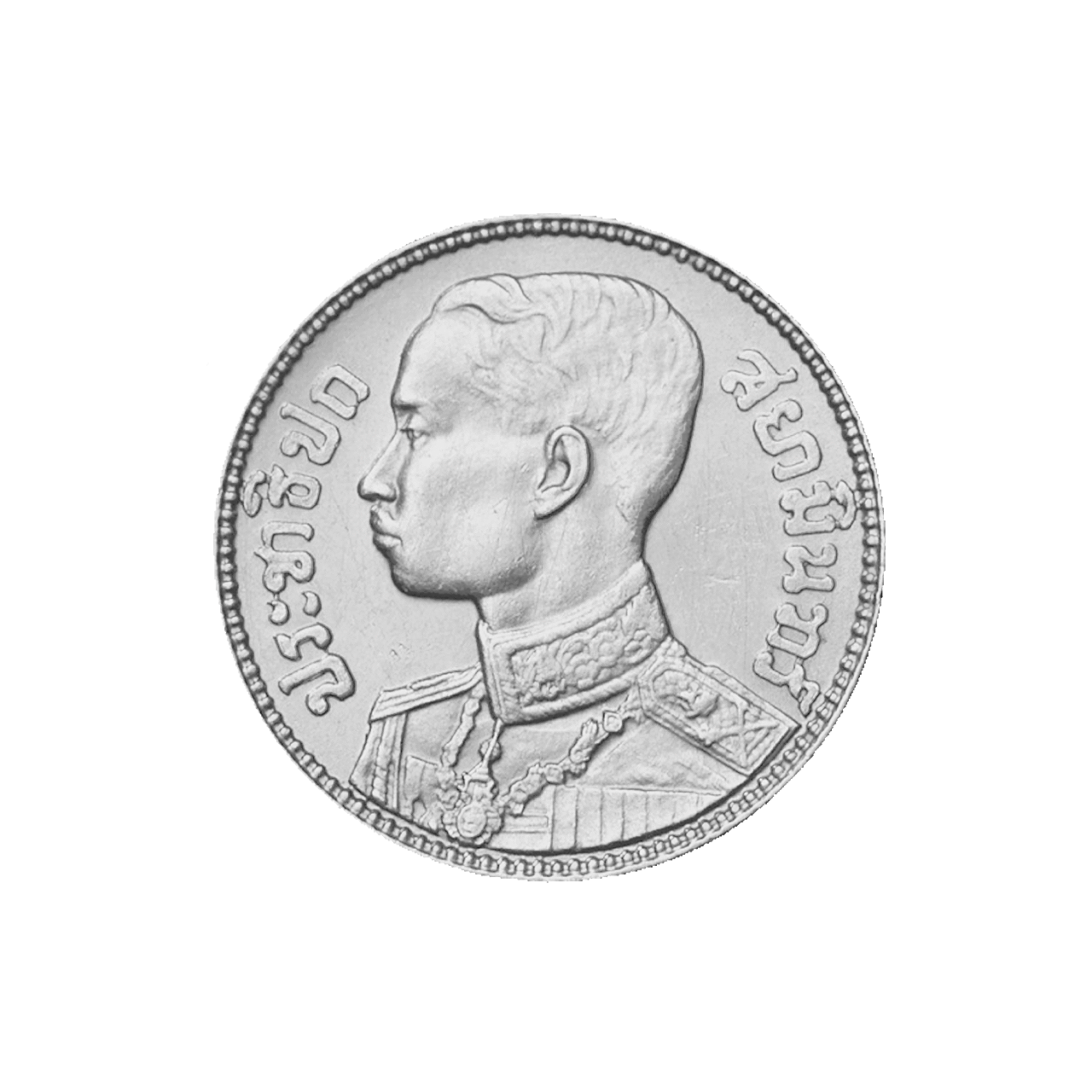
1929 - Rama 7

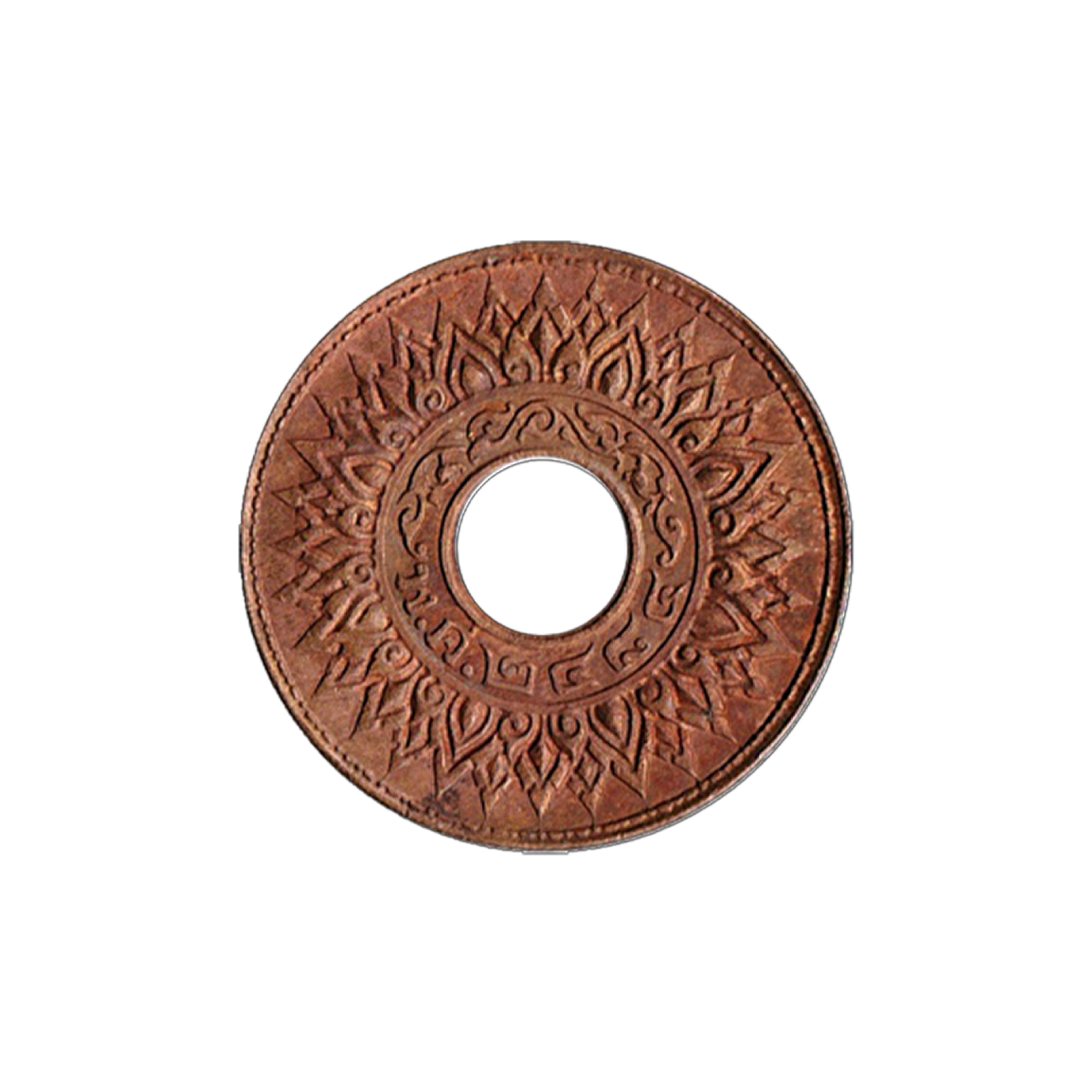
1941 - Lotus

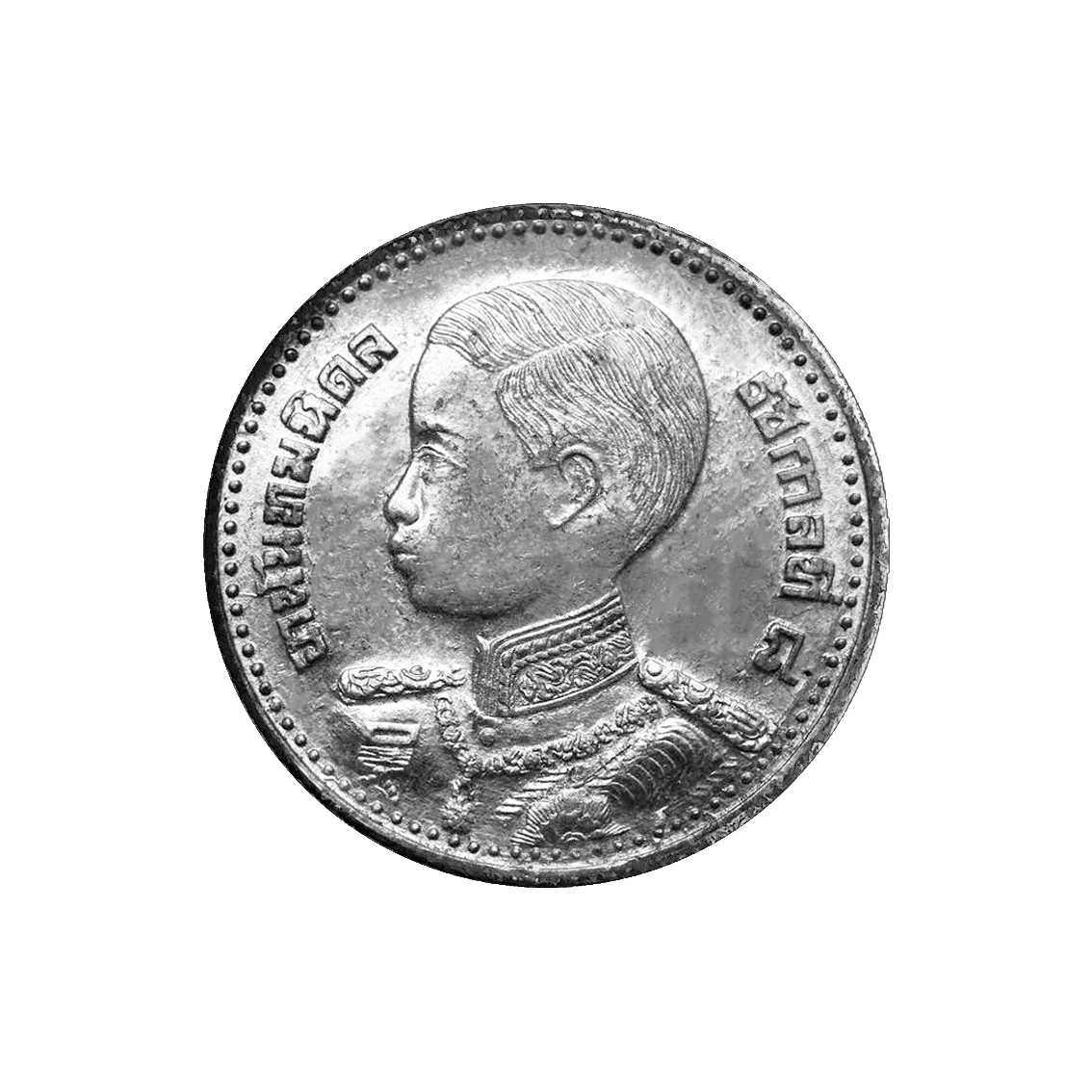
1946 - Rama 8 1st Portrait

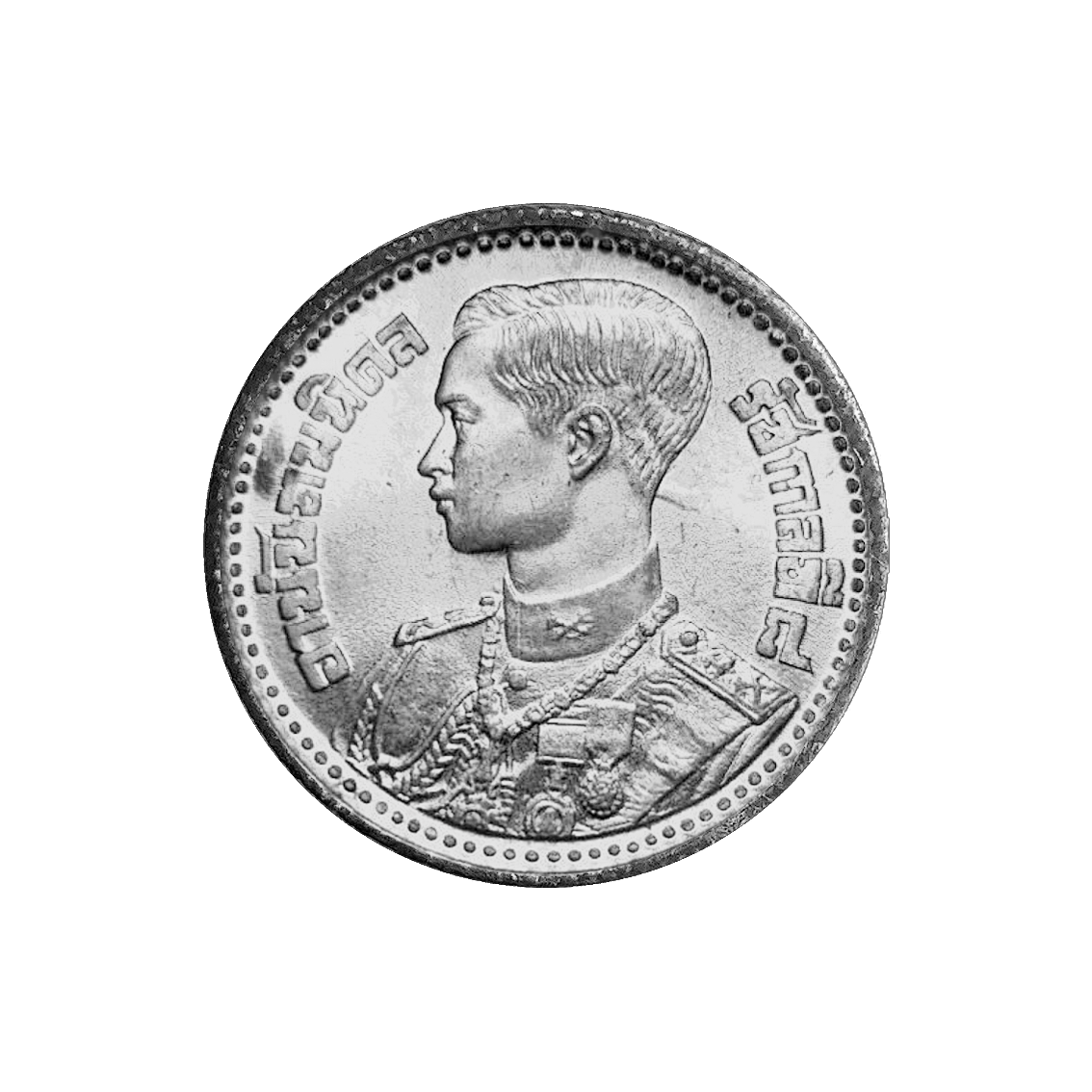
1946 - Rama 8 2nd Portrait

==== Rama IX ====
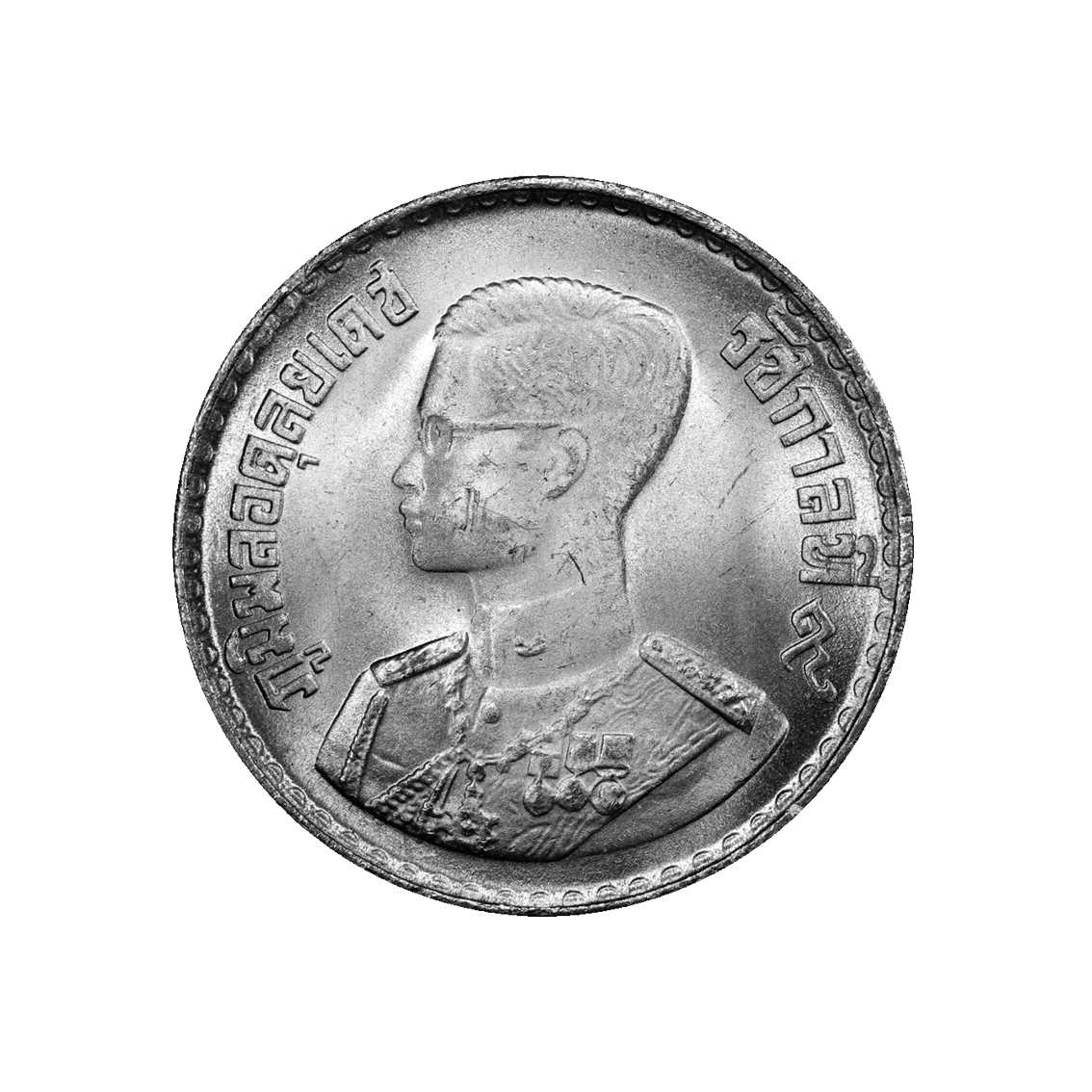
1957 - Rama 9 1st Portrait

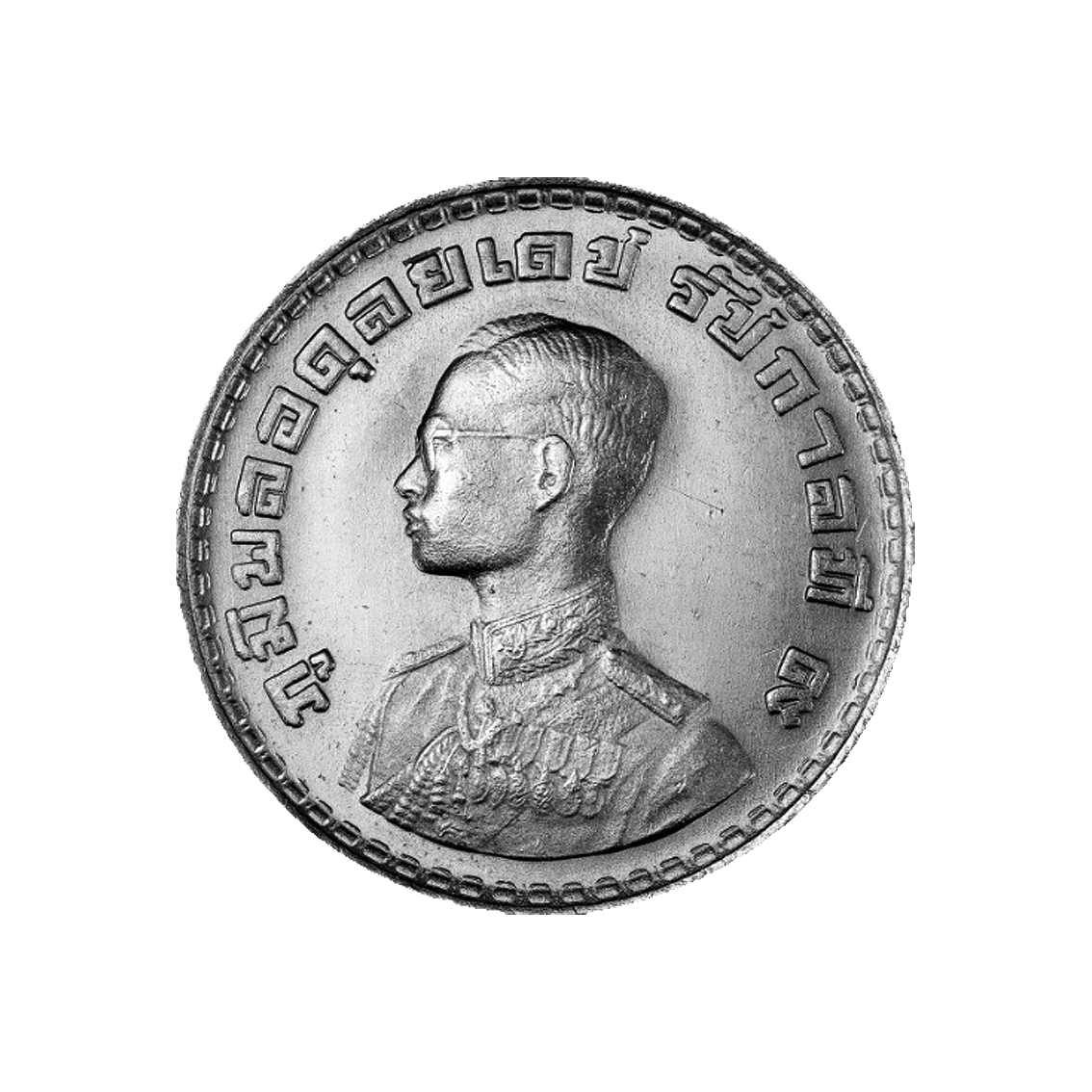
1962 - Rama 9 2nd Portrait

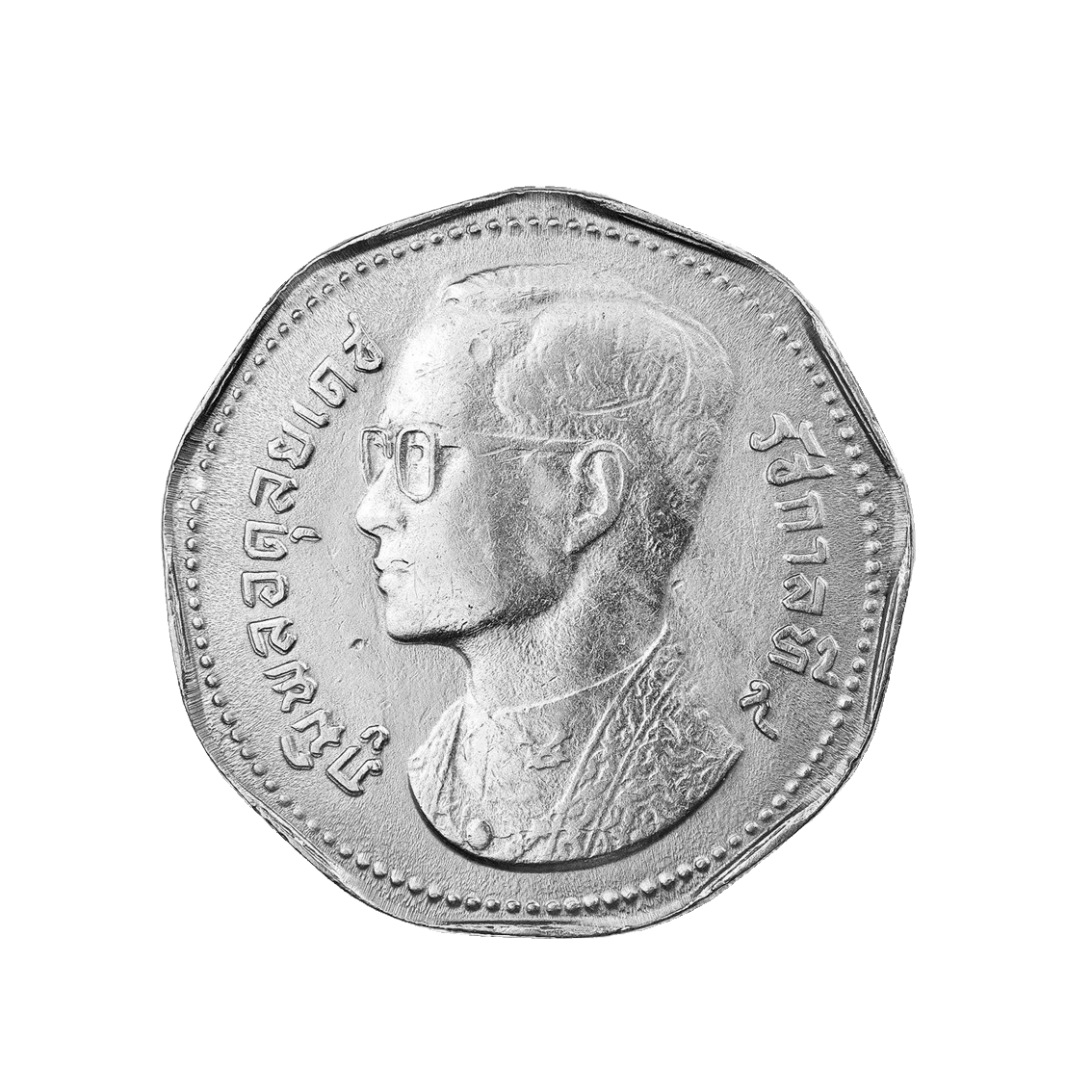
1972 - Rama 9 3rd Portrait

==== Rama X ====
2018 - Rama 10

=== Themes use on the reverse of coins ===
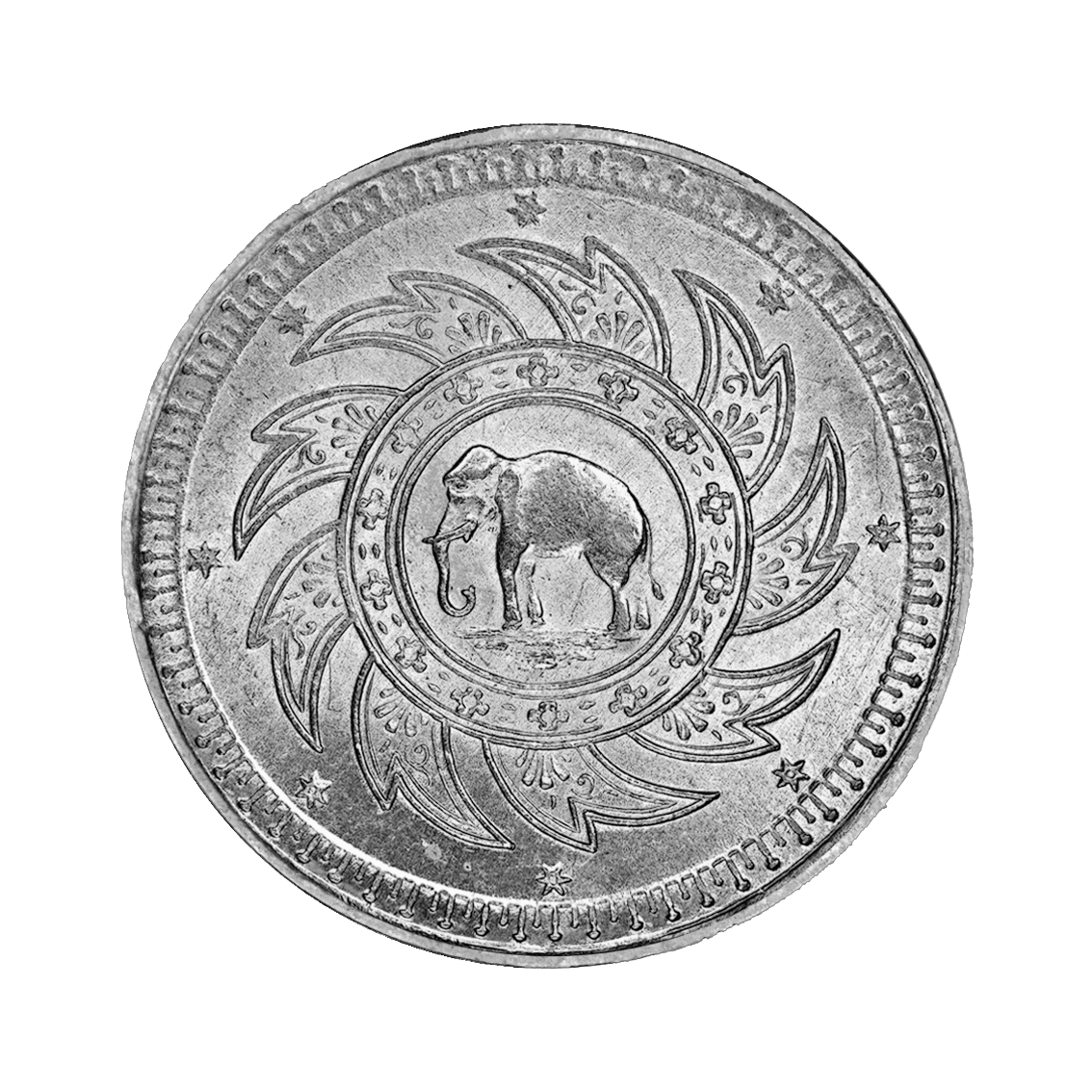
Dynastic Symbols

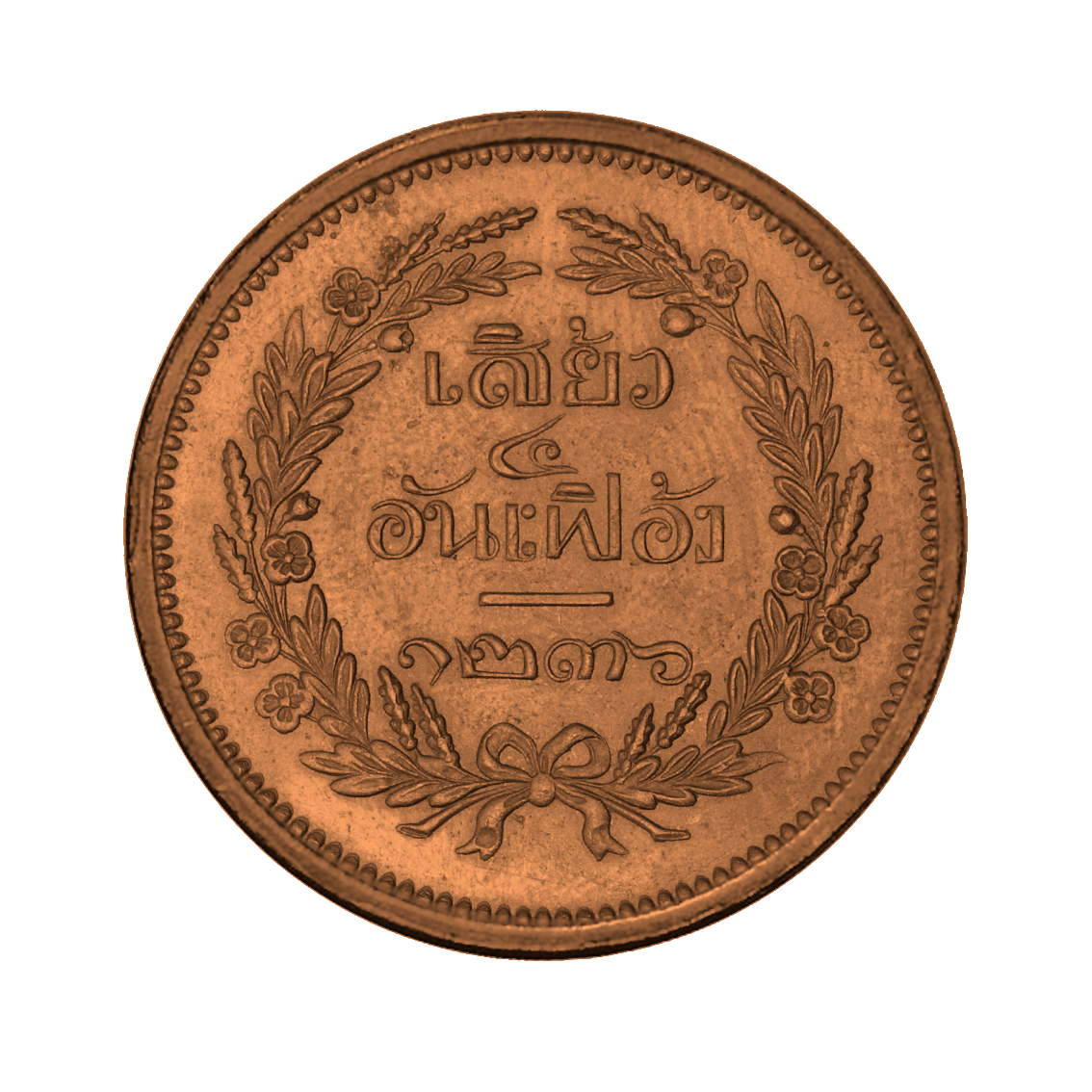
Flora Liveries

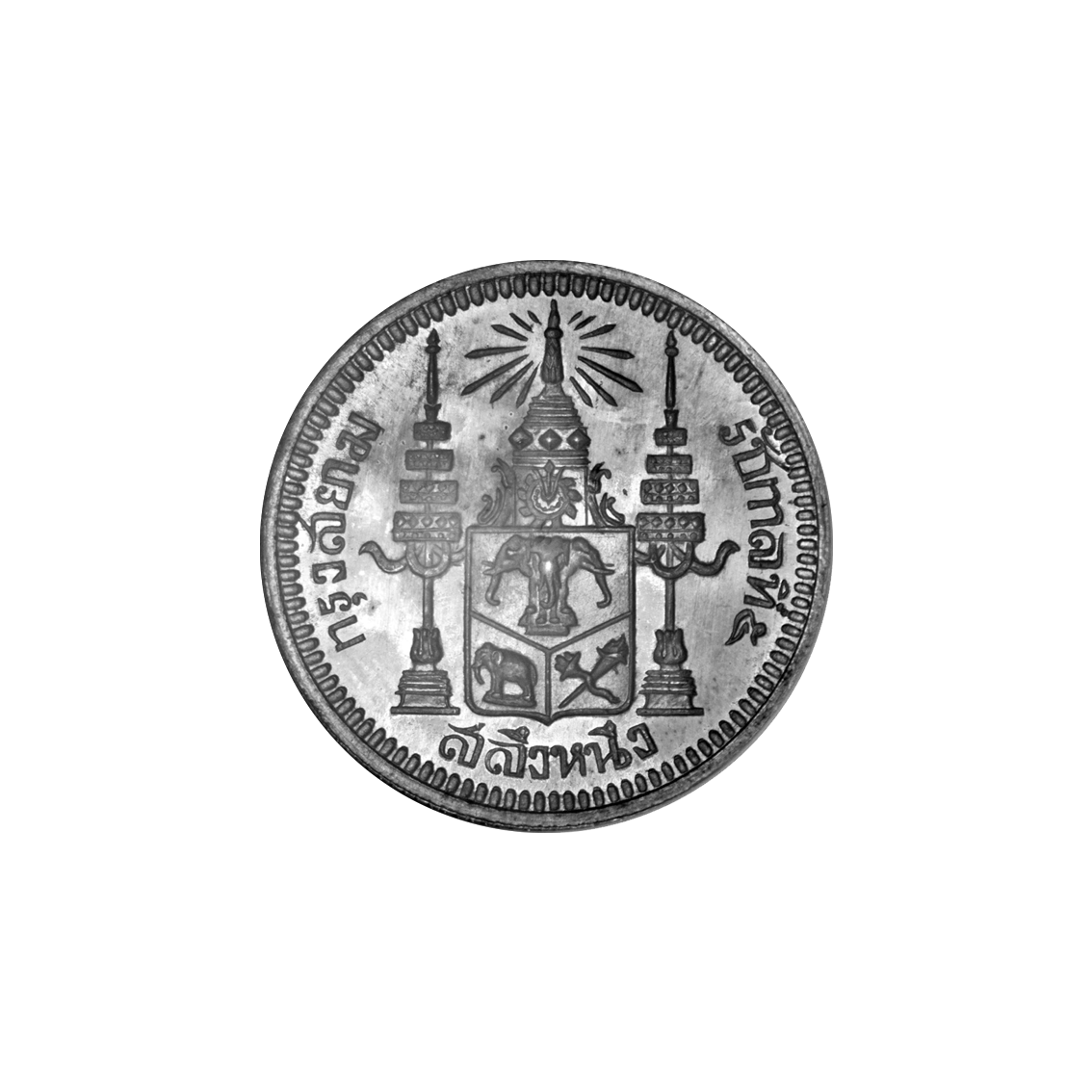
Royal Coat of Arms

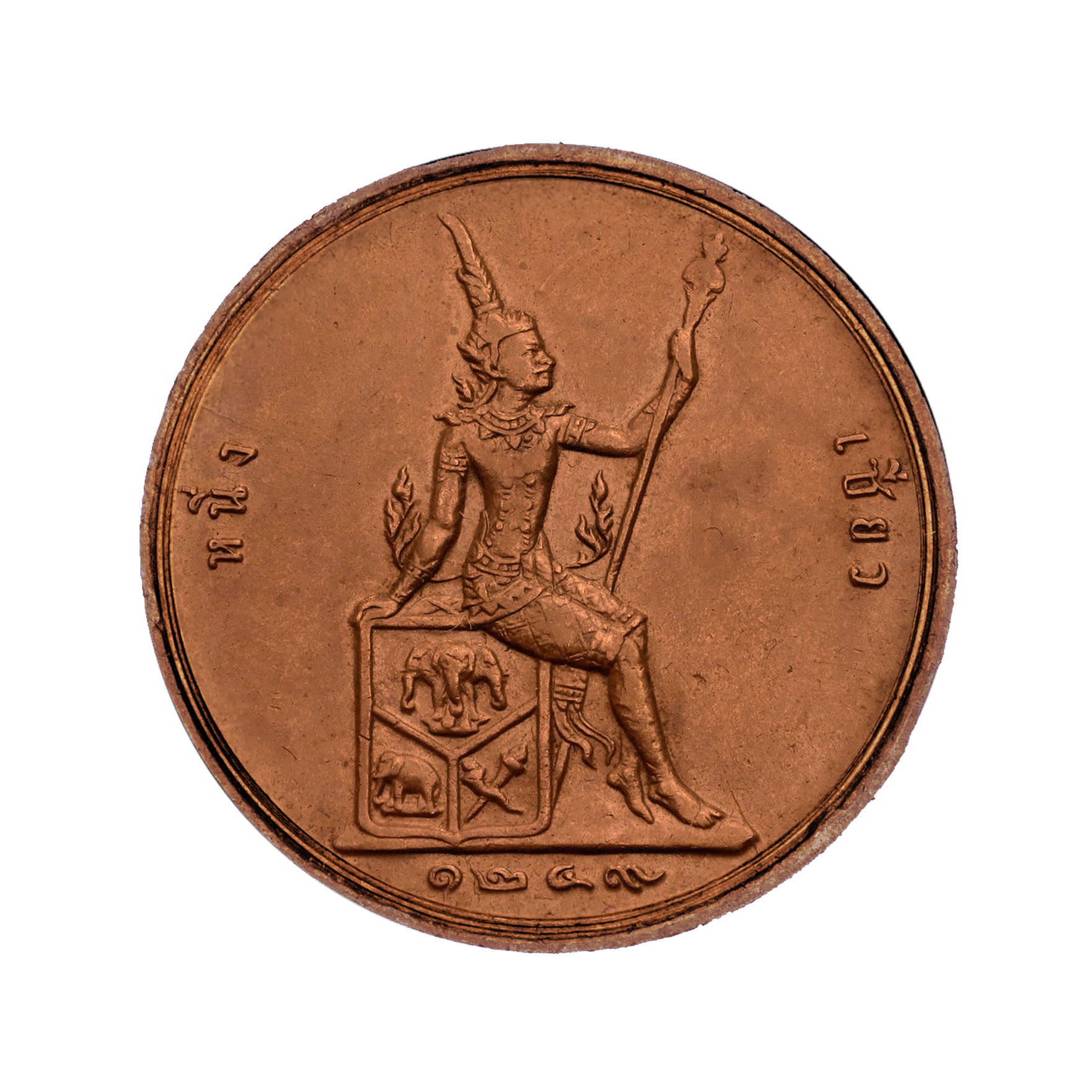
Dieties

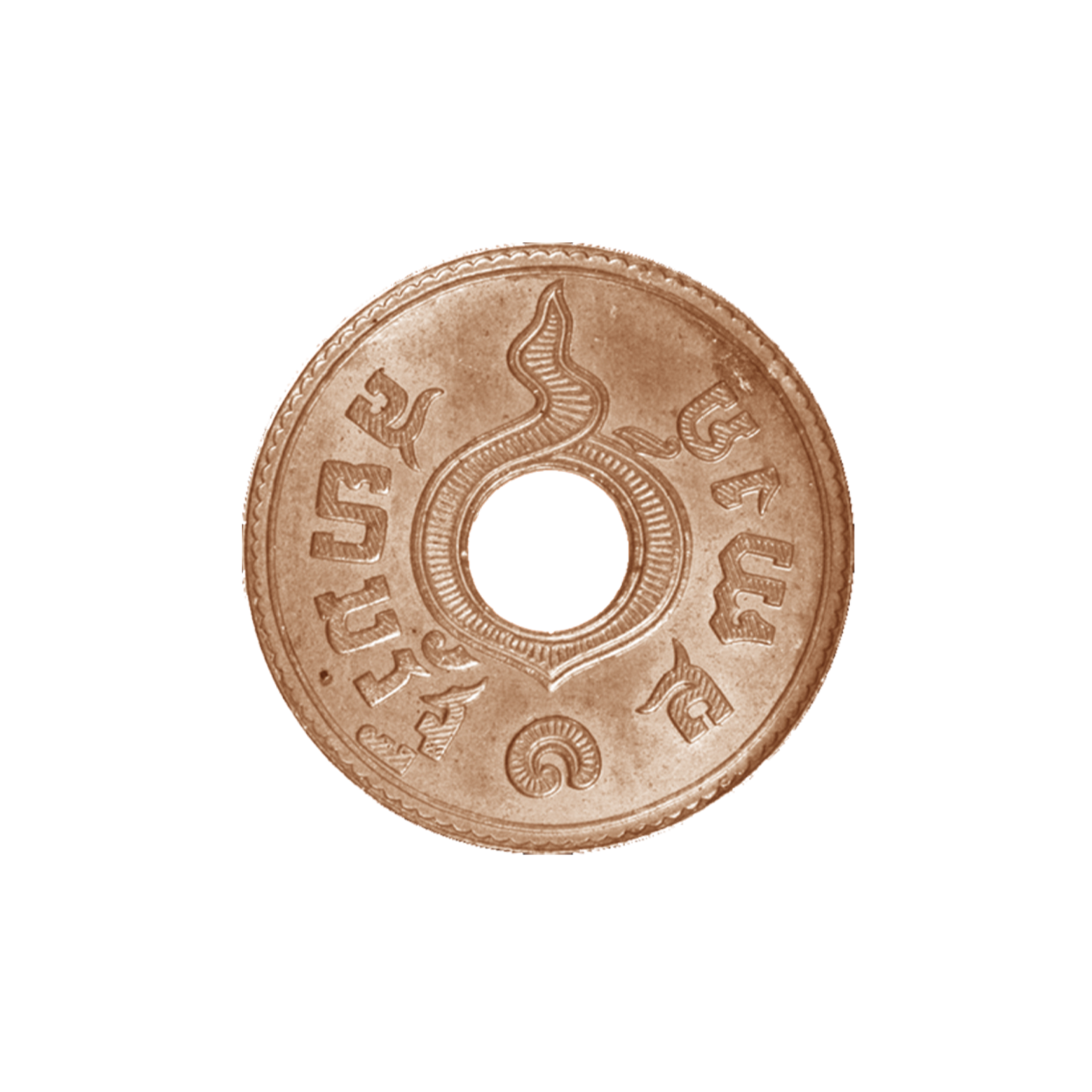
Buddhist Symbols

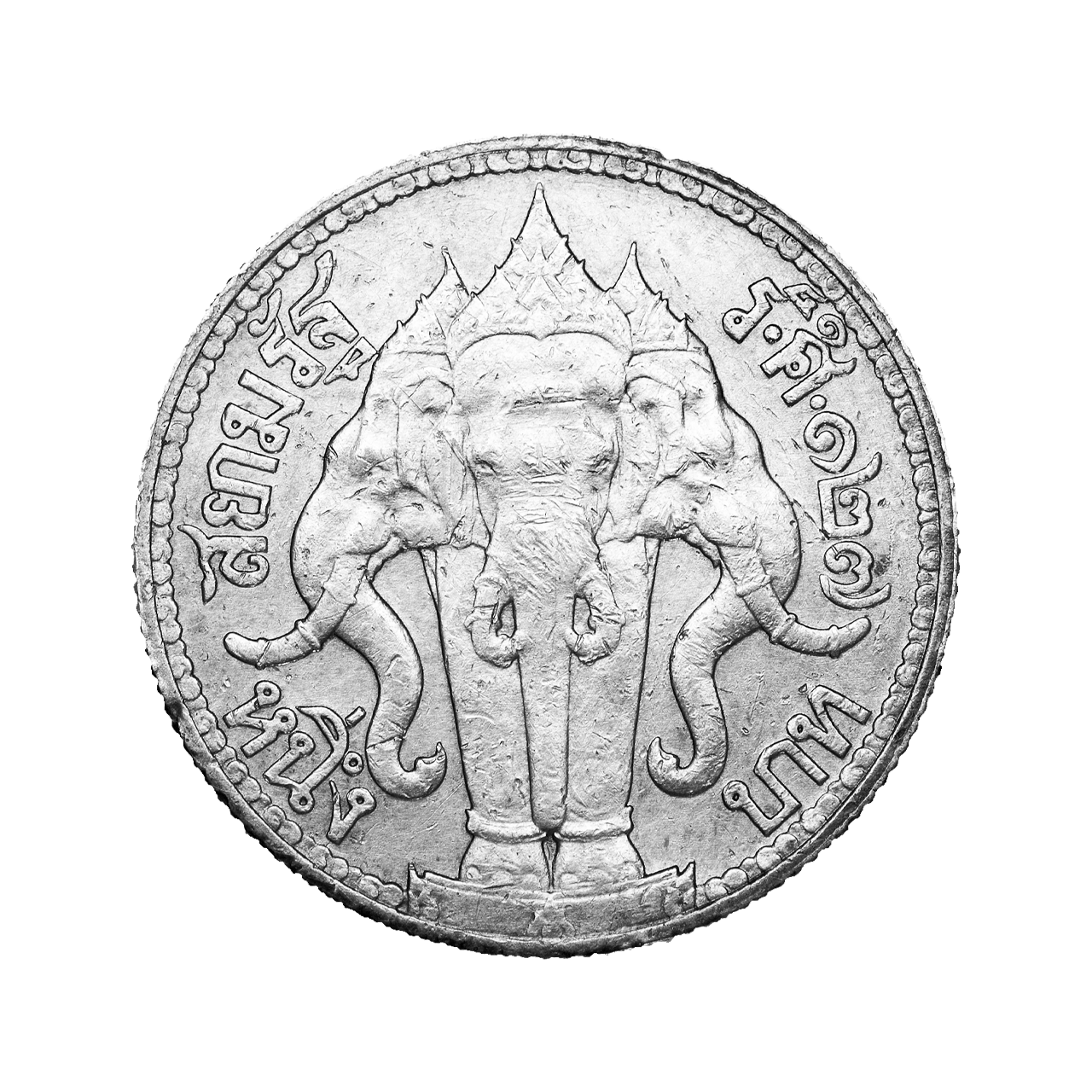
National Symbols

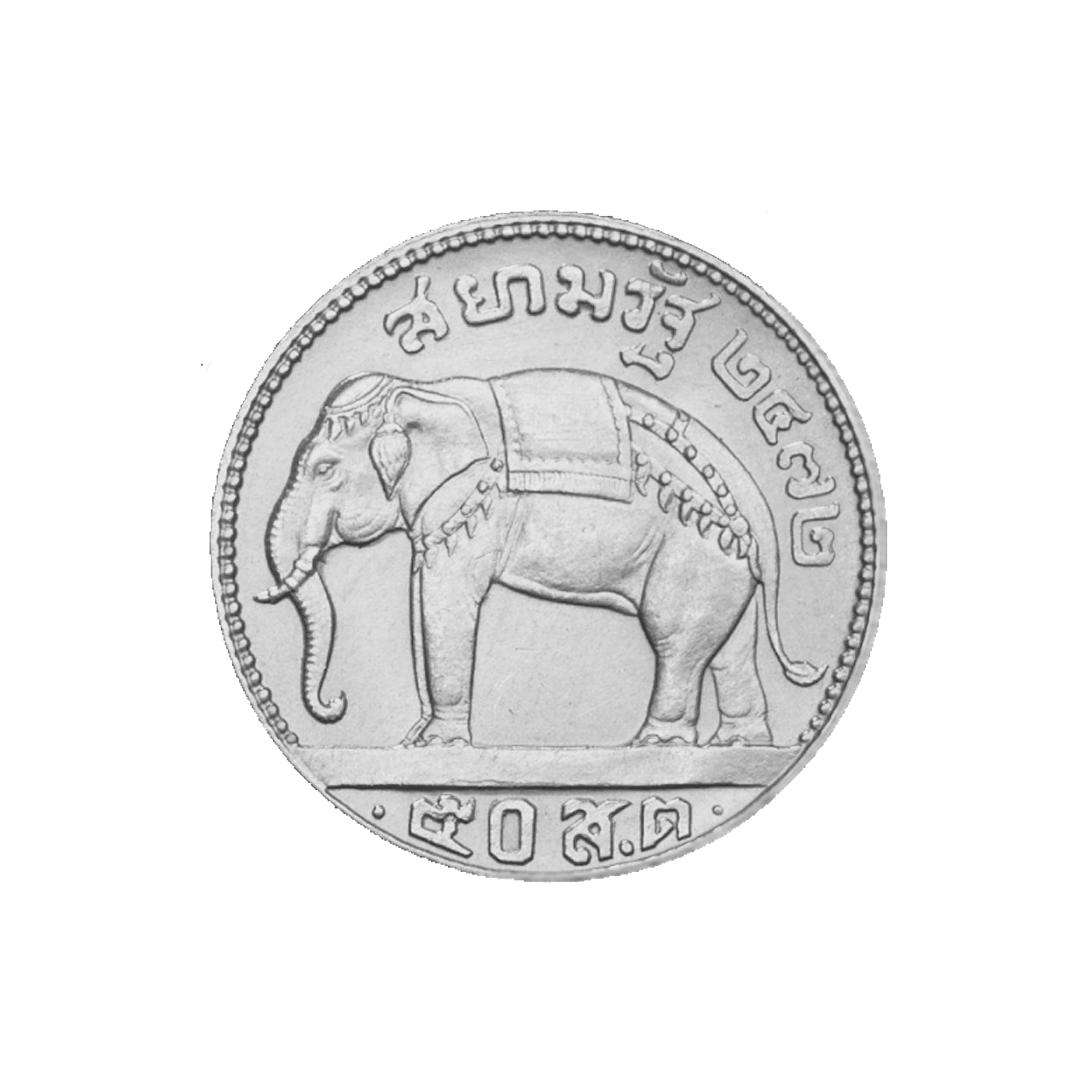
National Animal

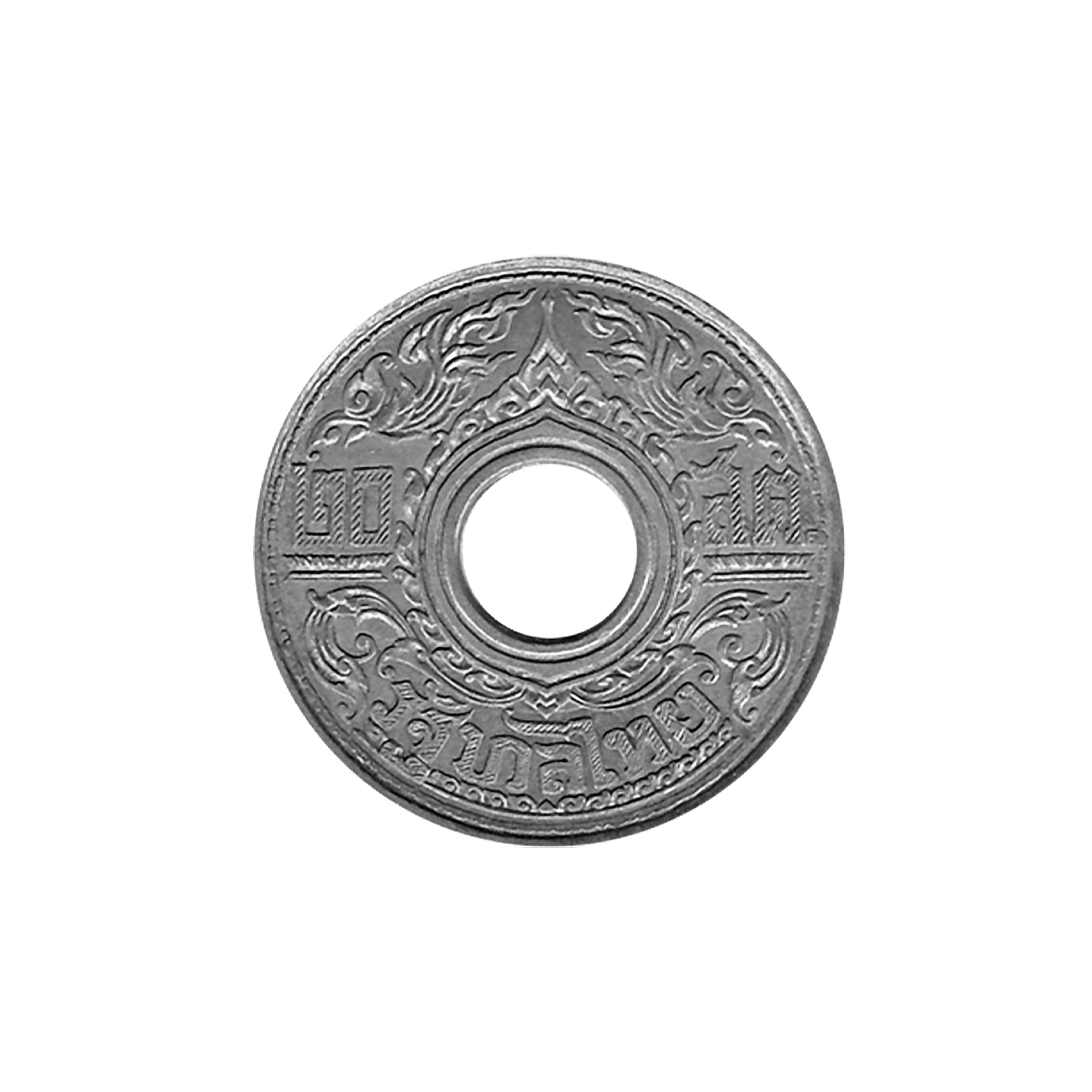
Architectural Liveries

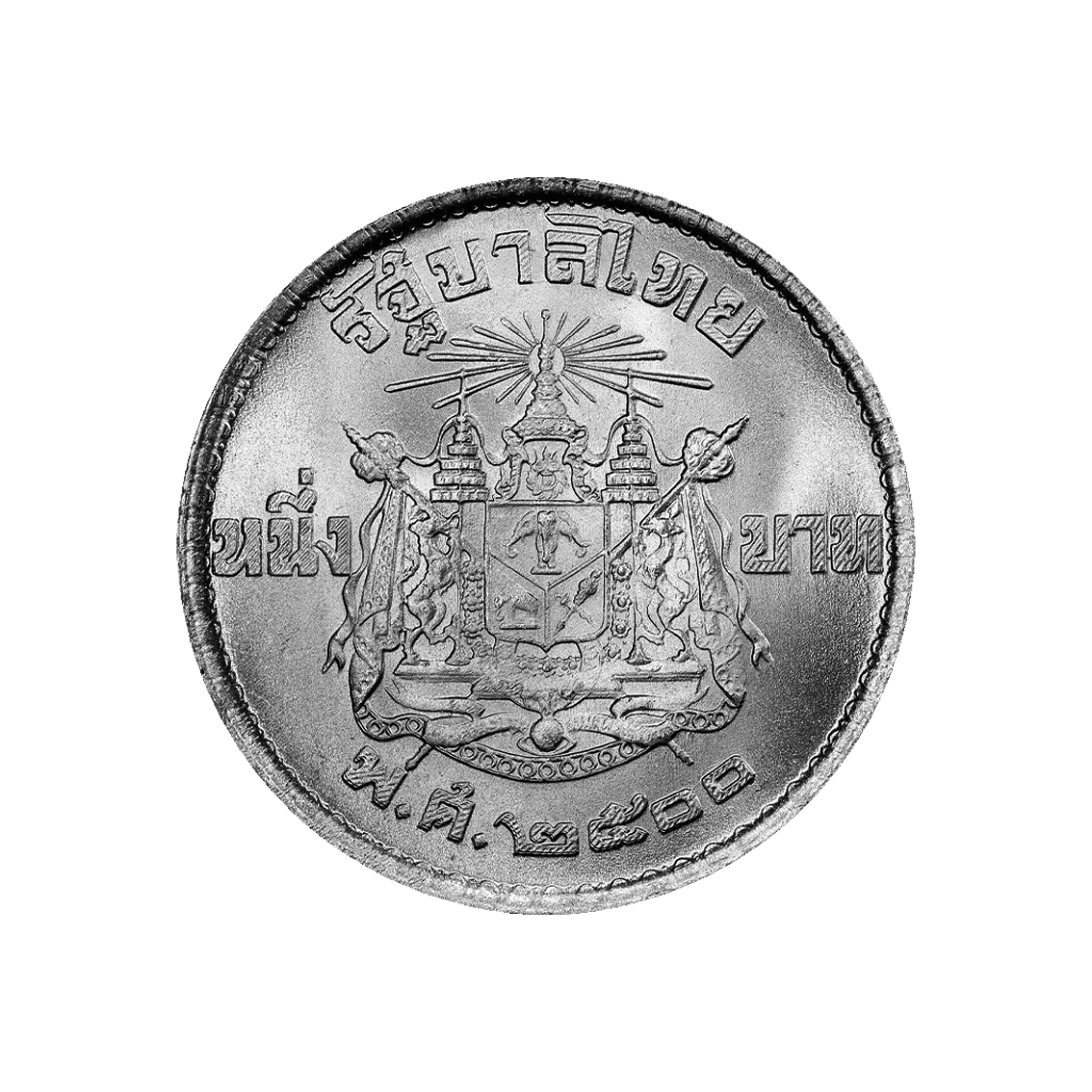
Coat of Arms

=== Names used on coins ===
Thai kings traditionally had 3 names: ceremonial, regnal, and personal. In everyday life, personal name are used more often than regnal names. A good example of this is King Narai, whose regnal name is King Ramathobodi III. The personal names of king also have variations in itself. An example is Rama X's personal name: Vajiralongkorn, in which the variation one might see is Vajiraklao. So when the new coinage was being carried out, the question of "what name should the mint depict?" pops up. Initially it's a mix of the variations of the personal names, later after King Rama VIII, and the switch to constitutional monarchy along with the changing of the country name to Thailand, the coin now use both regnal (alternative name) and personal names.

| King | Coin | Name | Title used on coins | Translation |
|---|---|---|---|---|
| | | Rama IV Mongkut | No name were used on this series of coin | |
| | | Rama IV Mongkut | 鄭明通寶 (zhèng míng tōng bǎo) dên mêng tong bo | Dên mêng, (Chinese Name of Rama IV) |
| | | Rama V Chulalongkorn | กรุงสยาม รัชกาลที่ ๕ krung-siam ratchakan-thi-ha | 5th reign of the Kingdom of Siam |
| | | Rama V Chulalongkorn | สมเด็จพระปรมินทรมหาจุฬาลงกรณ์ พระจุลจอมเกล้าเจ้าอยู่หัว somdet-phra-poraminthara-maha-chulalongkorn phra-chulachomklao-chao-yu-hua | His Majesty King Maha-Chulalongkorn, Lord of life Chulachomklao |
| | | Rama V Chulalongkorn | จุฬาลงกรณ์ ป.ร. พระจุลจอมเกล้าเจ้ากรุงสยาม chulalongkorn por-ror phra-chulachomklao-chao-krung-siam | Chulalongkorn Rex, Lord of life Chulachomklao of the Kingdom of Siam |
| | | Rama V Chulalongkorn | จุฬาลงกรณ์ สยามินทร์ chulalongkorn siam-min | Chulalongkorn, King of Siam |
| | | Rama VI Vajiravudh | มหาวชิราวุธ สยามินทร์ maha-vajiravudh siam-min | Maha-Vajiravudh, King of Siam |
| | | Rama VII Prajadhipok | ประชาธิปก สยามินทร์ prachadhipok siam-min | Prachadhipok, King of Siam |
| | | Rama VIII Ananda Mahidol | อานันทมหิดล รัชกาลที่ ๘ ananda-mahidol ratchakan-thi-paed | Ananda Mahidol of the 8th reign |
| | | Rama IX Bhumibol Adulyadej | สยามินทร์ รัชกาลที่ ๙ sayam-min ratchakan-thi-kao | 9th reign and the King of Siam |
| | | Rama IX Bhumibol Adulyadej | ประเทศไทย รัชกาลที่ ๙ prathet-thai ratchakan-thi-kao | 9th reign of the Kingdom of Thailand |
| | | Rama IX Bhumibol Adulyadej | ภูมิพลอดุลยเดช รัชกาลที่ ๙ bhumibol-adulyadej ratchakan-thi-kao | Bhumibol Adulyadej of the 9th reign |
| | jubilee issue | Rama IX Bhumibol Adulyadej | พระบาทสมเด็จพระปรมินทรมหาภูมิพลอดุลยเดชฯ สยามินทราธิราชบรมนาถบพิตร - รัชกาลที่ ๙ phrabat-somdet-phra-poraminthara-maha-phumiphon-adunyadet-etc. etc. siamminthara-thirat-borommanat-bophit ratchakan-thi-kao | The Supreme Lord, Great Incomparable Lord Bhumibol Adulyadej etc. etc. The Supreme King of Siam, of the 9th reign |
| | | Rama IX Bhumibol Adulyadej | ภูมิพลอดุลยเดช รัชกาลที่ ๙ bhumibol-adulyadej ratchakan-thi-kao | Bhumibol Adulyadej of the 9th reign |
| | | Rama X Vajiralongkorn | มหาวชิราลงกรณ รัชกาลที่ ๑๐ maha-vajiralongkorn ratchakan-thi-sip | Maha-Vajiralongkorn of the 10th reign |

==== Full ceremonial names on coins ====
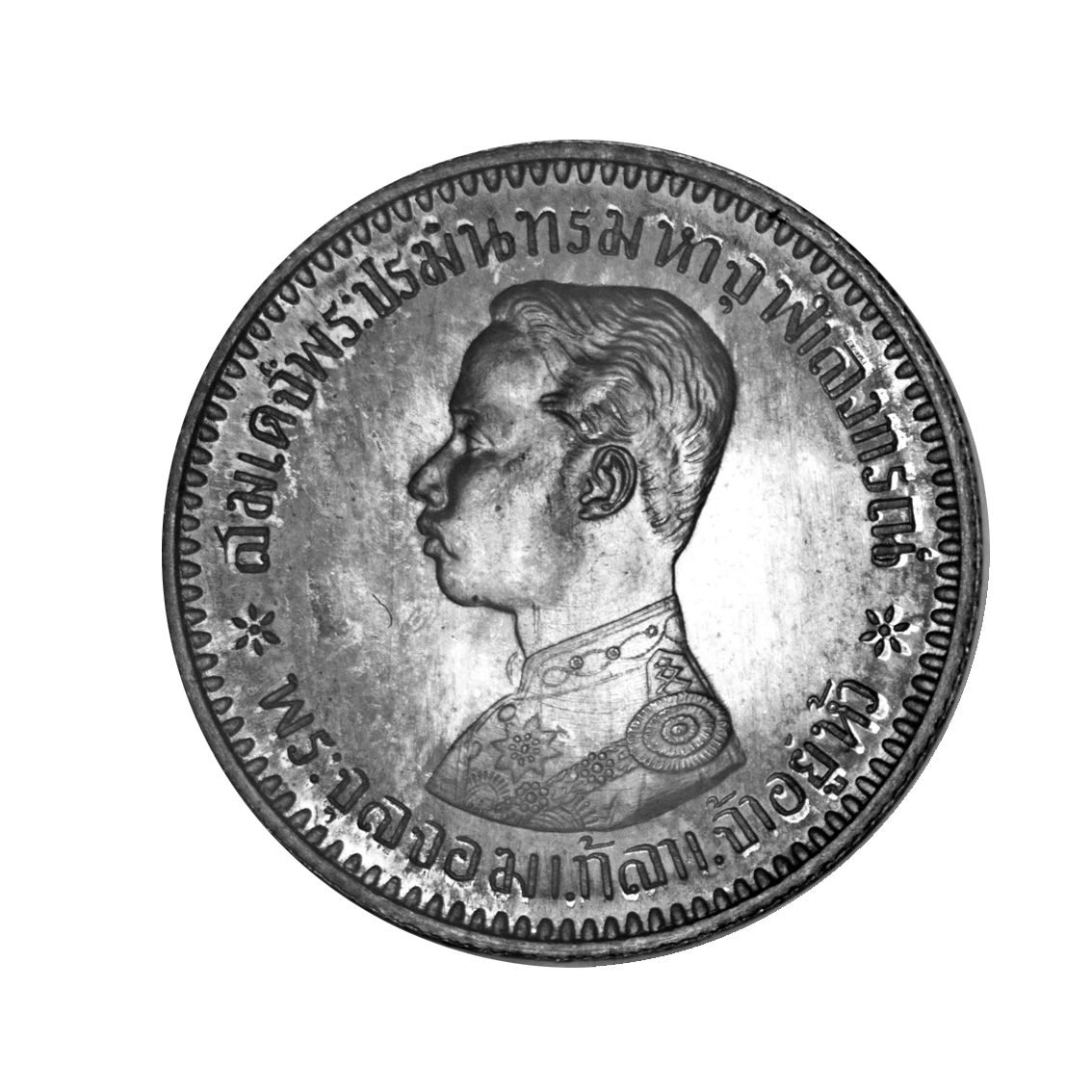

While standard circulating coinage relies on condensed personal names, commemorative issues and high-value historical specimens frequently utilize the monarch's full ceremonial title (Phranam Tem). Rooted heavily in Sanskrit and Pali compounds, these names are designed to convey cosmic authority, lineage, and protective merit. The reign of King Chulalongkorn marked the peak of expansive, unbroken text wrapped completely around the coin's edge. Rather than breaking the name into left and right fragments, these inscriptions read as a continuous clockwise or counterclockwise statement.

พระบาทสมเด็จพระปรมินทรมหาจุฬาลงกรณ์ พระจุลจอมเกล้าเจ้าอยู่หัว (Phrabat Somdet Phra Paraminthra Maha Chulalongkorn Phra Chula Chom Klao Chao Yu Hua)

This name explicitly details his status as supreme sovereign (Paraminthra Maha...) and references his formal reigning title (Phra Chulachomklao).

In the late 20th and early 21st centuries, full formal names were largely reserved for commemorative coins celebrating major milestones, such as 50th or 60th year of accession jubilee to the throne, or royal birthdays.

==== Title and Siammin on coins ====
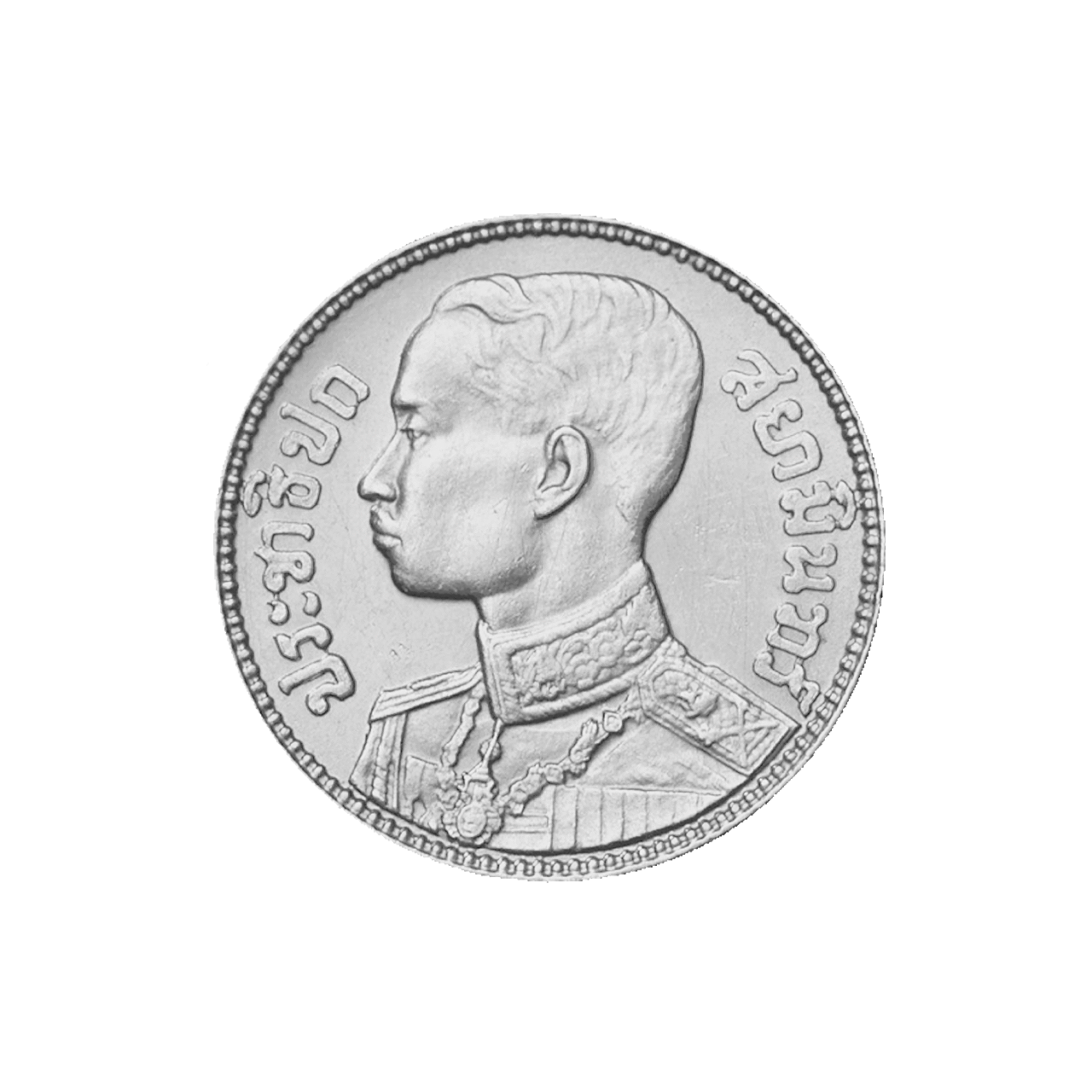

As numismatic designs required cleaner presentation on standard denominations in the late nineteenth and early twentieth centuries, the lengthy full title was condensed into a specific formula pairing the personal name with a supreme sovereign title. This configuration utilized the high register Sanskrit derivative สยามินทร์ (Siammin) or สยามินทราธิราช (Siamminthrathirat), translating to "Sovereign of Siam".

มหาวชิราวุธ สยามินทร์ (Mahavajiravudh Siammin)

Following the transition to a constitutional monarchy and the official renaming of the nation from Siam to Thailand in 1939, coinage design protocols shifted away from absolute imperial titles. The mid twentieth century saw the rise of a modernized typology that paired the personal name of the monarch directly with the national indicator ประเทศไทย (Prathet Thai).

==== Final use of Siammin ====

A highly notable event in modern numismatic history occurred during the transition between these typographic styles in 1977 (B.E. 2520). The mint authorities released a new standard copper nickel Baht coin bear the Prathet Thai + Ratchakan format, featuring the portrait of King Bhumibol Adulyadej on the obverse and the royal barge Suphannahong on the reverse. During the series' production, the 5 baht coin displayed the archaic Siammin title (สยามินทร์) alongside the monarch's name. Prior to this the coin used title + ratchakan format, and the last use of the Siammin title before this was in the 1930s

ประเทศไทย รัชกาลที่ ๙ (Prathet Thai Ratchakan thi 9) on the 1 baht สยามินทร์ รัชกาลที่ ๙ (Siammin Ratchakan thi 9) on the 5 baht

This is the last regular issue to use the title of Siammin, after this issue there was a 1996 jubilee issue which was then the final use.

==== Maha prefix on names ====

All monarchs have the Maha- prefix in their titles, but not all monarchs use this prefix in everyday use. The most common variant used for Rama 9 do not have the Maha- prefix. The coin issued for Rama 6 and Rama 10 do have this prefix.

==== Modern convention of names (title + ratchakan) ====
The contemporary system governing Thai circulating coinage relies on a standard. This format shifts the geographic state indicator (ประเทศไทย) entirely to the reverse side of the coin. This layout leaves the obverse perimeter dedicated exclusively to identifying the individual monarch and balancing their personal name and their formal chronological placement within the Chakri Dynasty.

มหาวชิราลงกรณ รัชกาลที่ ๑๐ (Mahavajiralongkorn Ratchakan thi 10)

=== Calendar systems of Thai coinage ===
Over the course of Siamese coinage history, various calendar systems were used. The first one to be applied onto the coins was the Burmese calendar system or Chula Sakarat (C.S.), which was subsequently supplanted by the Rattanakosin Sok system (R.S.) which started at the founding of the Rattanakosin Kingdom. The system in use right now is the Phuttha Sakarat system or the Buddhist calendar (B.E.).

Calendar Reference Table
| Burmese Calendar [-638 AD] | Rattanakosin Calendar [-1781 AD] | Buddhist Calendar [+543 AD] | Gregorian Calendar |
|---|---|---|---|
| Chulasakarat is +638 years | Rattanakosinsok is +1781 years | Phutthasakarat is -543 years | 0 AD |
| 1236 CS | 93 RS | 2417 BE | 1874 AD |
| 1261 CS | 118 RS | 2442 BE | 1899 AD |
| 1291 CS | 148 RS | 2472 BE | 1929 AD |
| ..... | ..... | ..... | ..... |
| 1385 CS | 242 RS | 2566 BE | 2023 AD |
| 1386 CS | 243 RS | 2567 BE | 2024 AD |
| 1387 CS | 244 RS | 2568 BE | 2025 AD |

== Banknotes ==
In 1851, the government issued notes for 1/8, 1/4, 3/8, 1/2 and 1 tical, followed by 3, 4, 6 and 10 tamlueng in 1853. After 1857, notes for 20 and 40 ticals were issued, also bearing their values in Straits dollars and Indian rupees. Undated notes were also issued before 1868 for 5, 7, 8, 12 and 15 tamlueng, and 1 chang. One at notes were issued in 1874.

In 1892, the treasury issued notes for 1, 5, 10, 40, 80, 100, 400 and 800 ticals, called "baht" in the Thai text.

On 10 September 1902, the government introduced notes which were printed by Thomas De La Rue & Company Limited (De La Rue) in England, during the reigns of Kings Rama V and Rama VI, denominated 5, 10, 20, 100 and 1000 ticals, still called baht in the Thai text — each denomination having many types, with 1 and 50 tical notes following in 1918. In 1925, notes were issued in denominations of 1, 5, 10, 20, 100 and 1,000 baht with the denomination in both Arabic and Thai numerals without English text; English speakers continued to refer to these as "ticals".

On 27 July 2010, the Bank of Thailand announced that the 16th-series banknotes would enter circulation in December 2010. On 9 August 2012, the Bank of Thailand issued a new denomination banknote, 80 baht, to commemorate queen Sirikit's 80th birthday. It was the first Thai banknote that featured Crane's MOTION security thread.

In 2017, the Bank of Thailand announced a new family of banknotes in remembrance of the late King Bhumibol Adulyadej (Rama IX). The notes are the same size and dimensions as the "Series 16" banknotes, with the front designs as before, but the back designs featuring images of the king's life in infancy, adolescence and maturity. The new family of banknotes were issued on September 20.

In 2018, the Bank of Thailand announced a new family of banknotes featuring a portrait of the current King Vajiralongkorn (Rama X). The main colors and dimensions of the notes are the same as before, with the back designs featuring images of the Kings of Thailand from past to present. The 20, 50 and 100 baht banknotes were issued on Chakri Memorial Day, 6 April 2018. The final two denominations, 500 and 1,000 baht were issued on the anniversary of the birth of King Maha Vajiralongkorn, 28 July 2018.

=== Decimal banknotes ===
==== Portraits of Monarchs ====
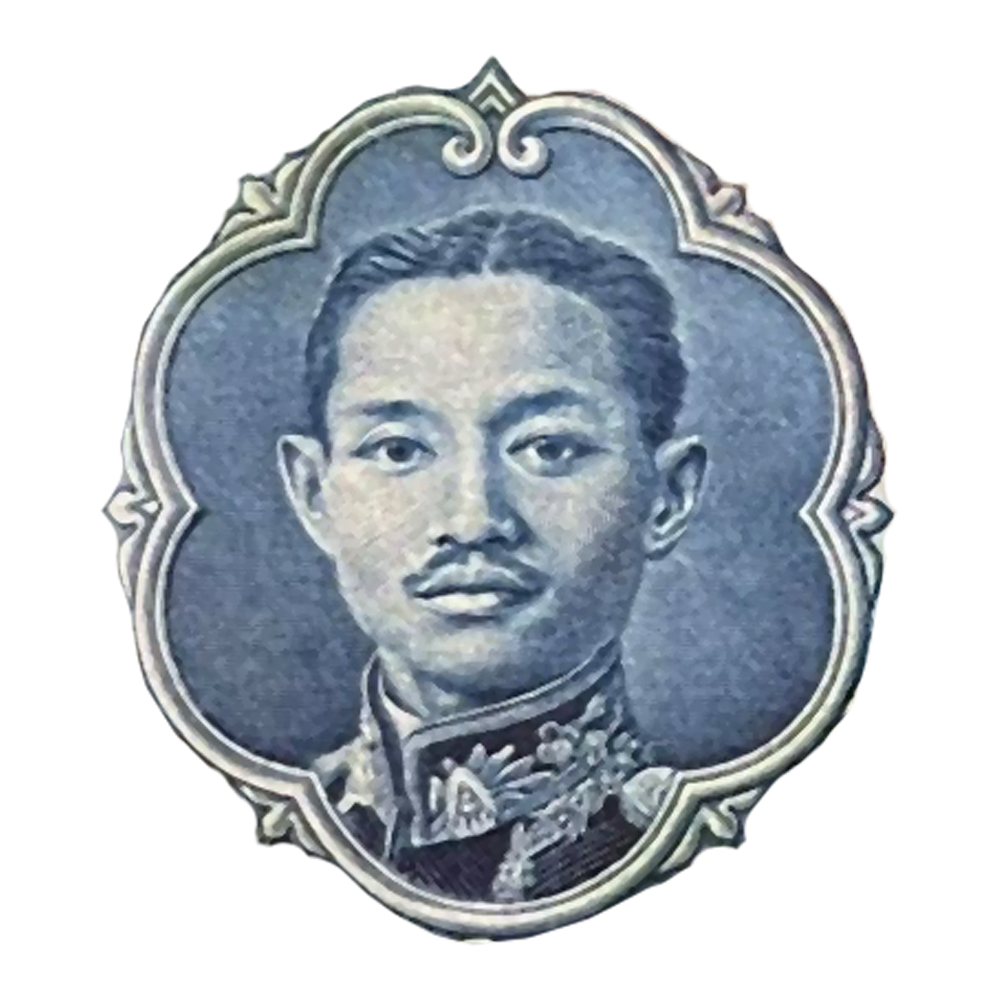
1934

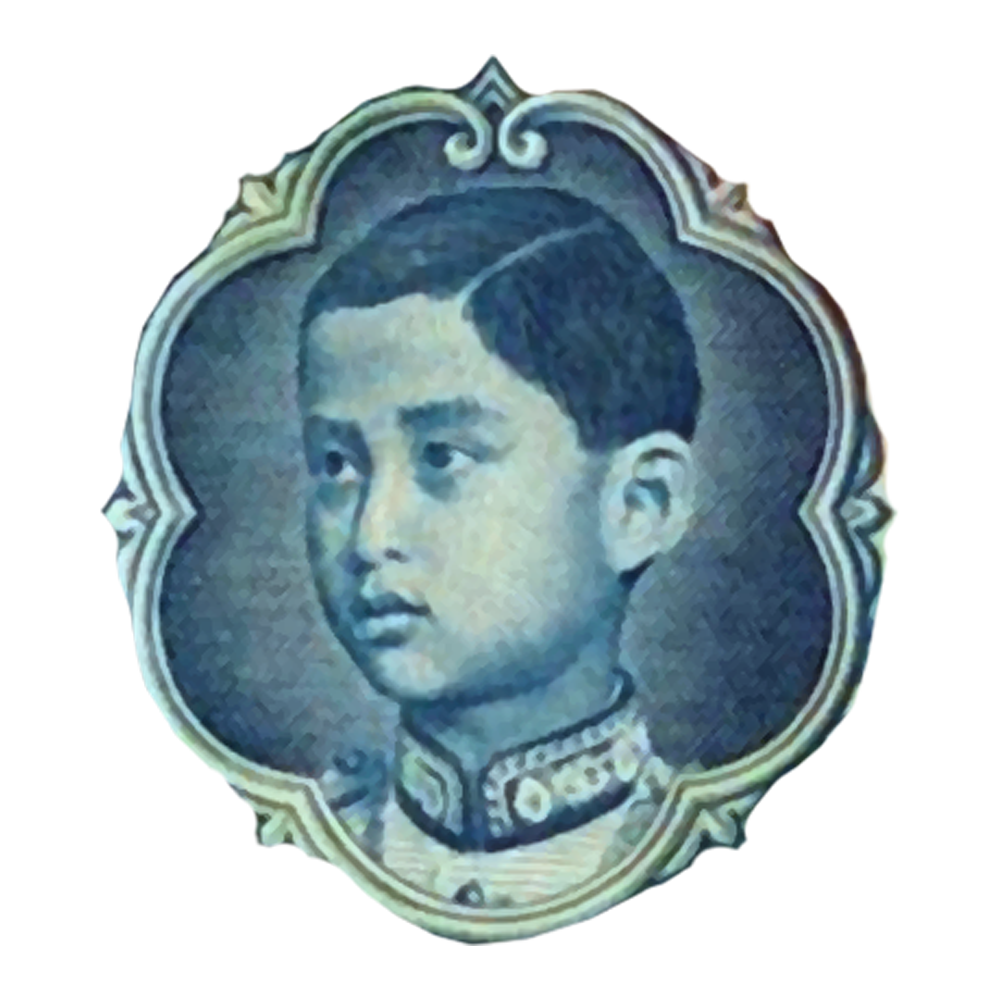
1935

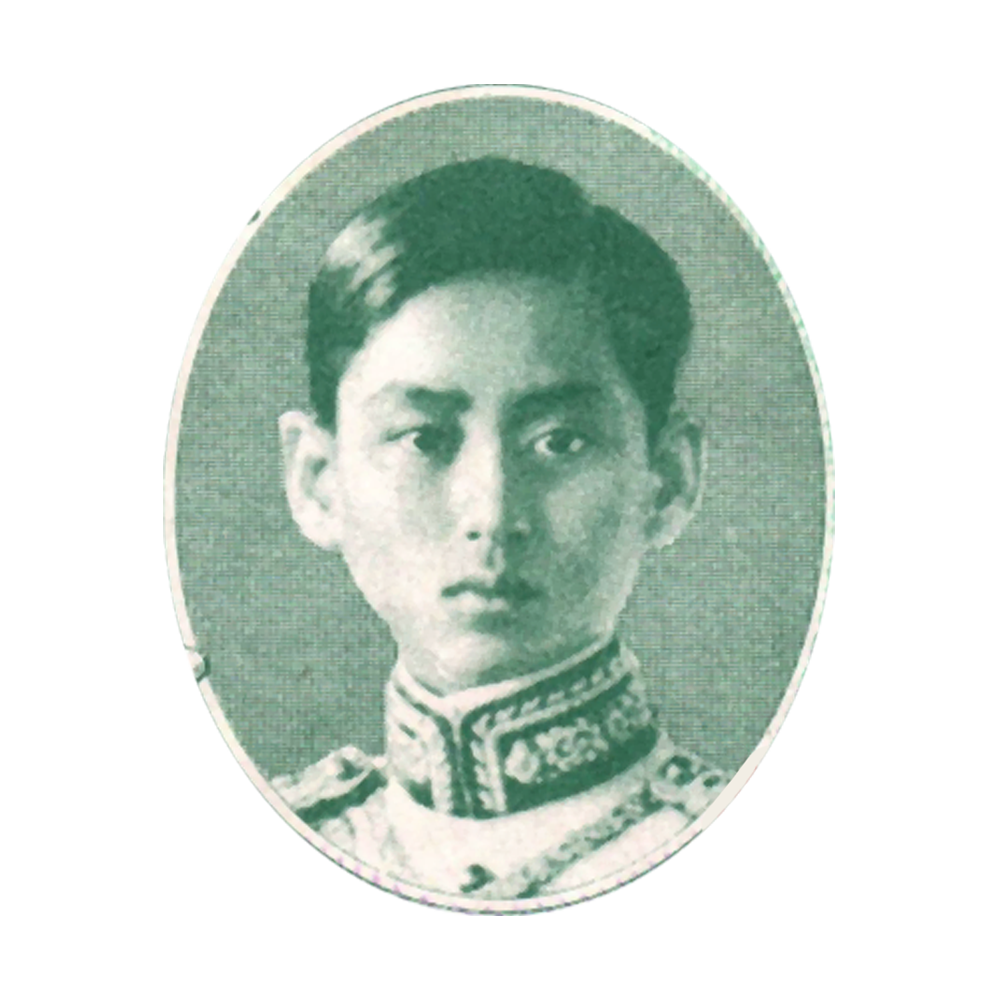
1942 - 1948

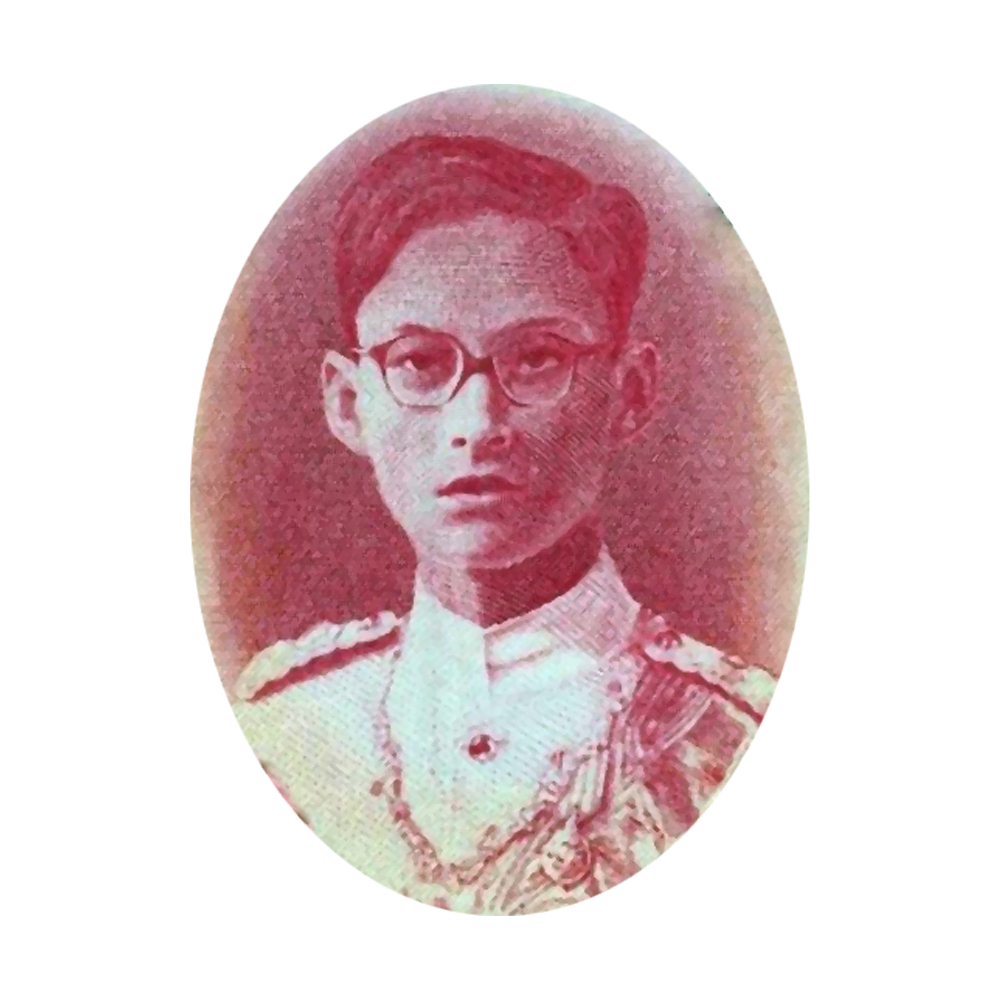
1948 - 1955

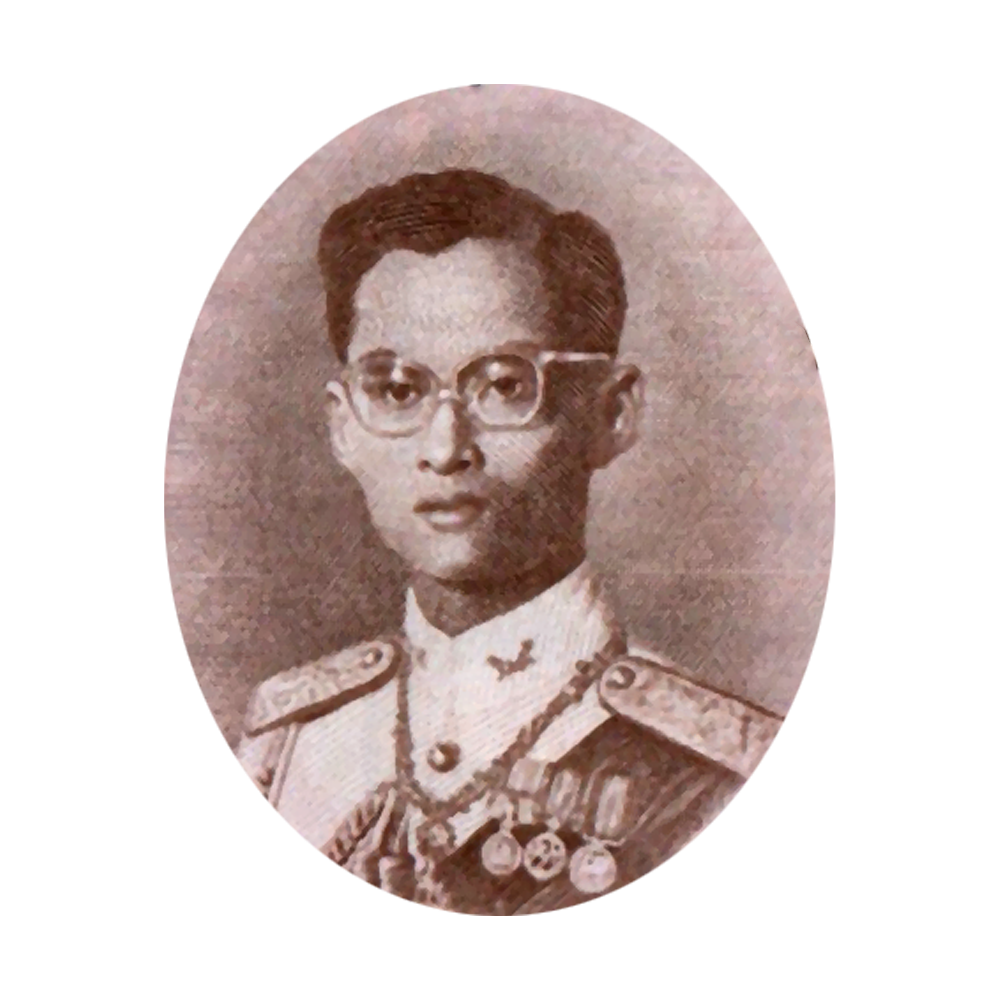
1955 - 1968

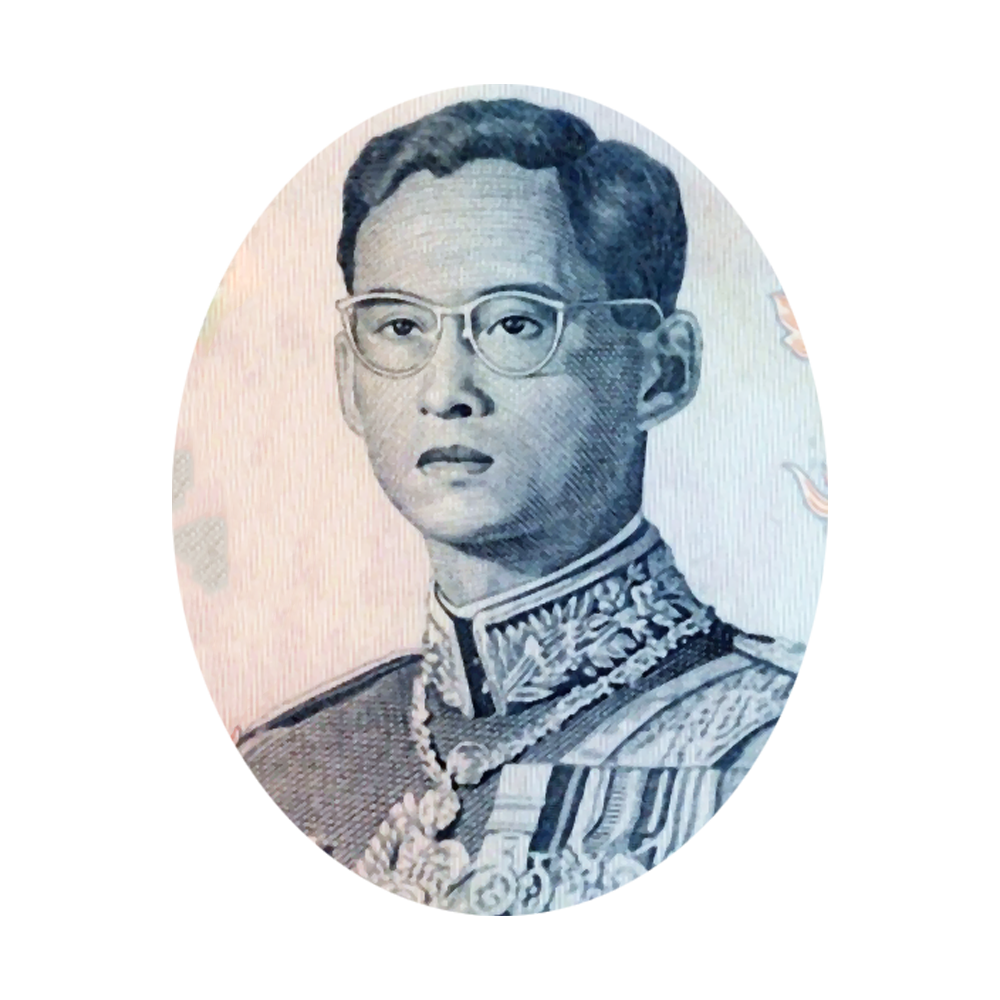
1968

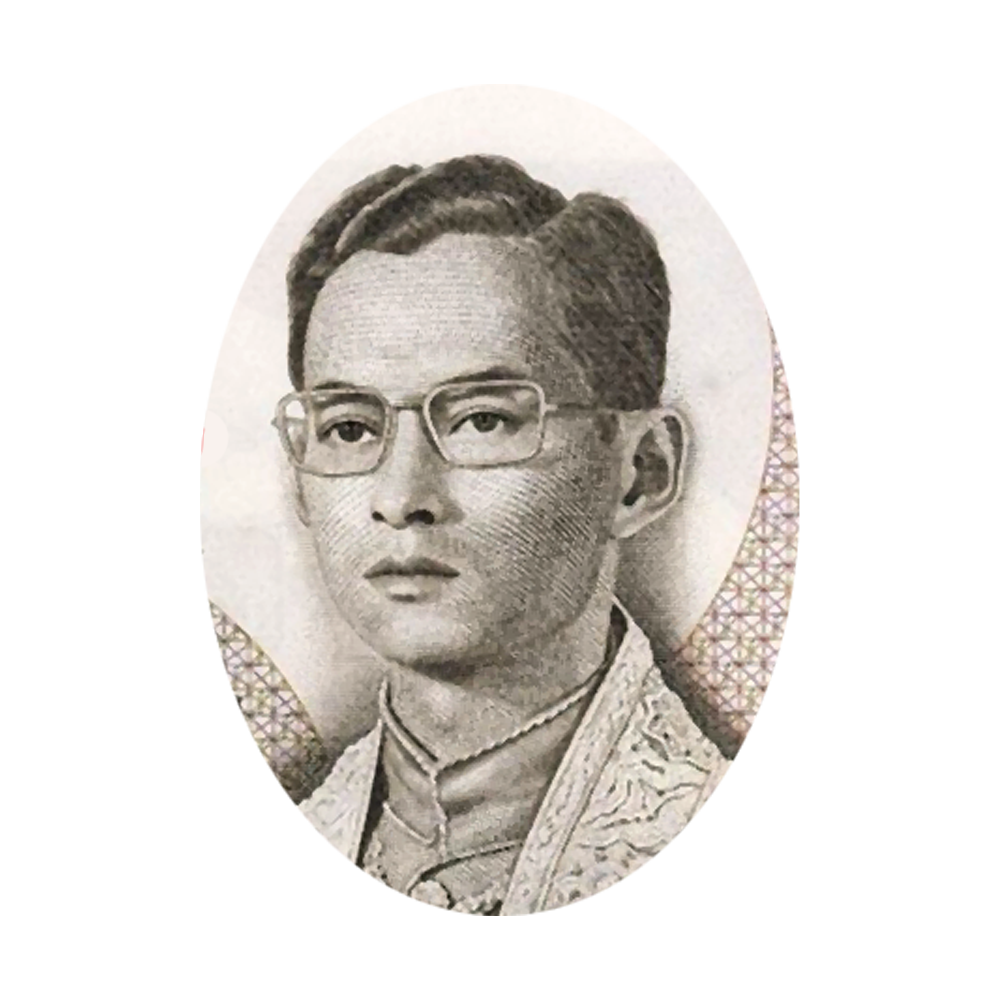
1968 - 1978

==== Summary of Decimal Banknotes ====
| | 50 Satang | 1 Baht | 5 Baht | 10 Baht | 20 Baht | 50 Baht | 100 Baht | 500 Baht | 1000 Baht |
|---|---|---|---|---|---|---|---|---|---|
| Series 1 1902–1928 (24 years) | | | | | | | | | |
| Series 2 1925–1934 (9 years) | | | | | | | | | |
| Series 3 1934–1935 (1 year) | | | | | | | | | |
| Series 3–2 1935–1937 (3 years) | | | | | | | | | |
| Series 4 1937–1942 (5 years) | | | | | | | | | |
| Series 5 1942–1945 (5 years) | | | | | | | | | |
| Series 6 1945 (<1 year) | | | | | | | | | |
| Series 7 1945 (<1 year) | | | | | | | | | |
| Series 8 1945–1948 (3 years) | | | | | | | | | |
| Series 9 1948–1971 (23 years) | | | | | | | | | |
| Series 10 1969 (<1 year) | | | | | | | | | |
| Series 11 1969–1988 (19 years) | | | | | | | | | |
| Series 12 & 13 1978–2003 (25 years) | | | | | | | | | |
| Series 14 1992–2005 (13 years) | | | | | | | | | |
| Series 15 2001–2015 (14 years) | | | | | | | | | |
| Series 16 2013–2018 (5 years) | | | | | | | | | |
| Series 17 (current series) 2018–present 8 years | | | | | | | | | |
Series 12 –15: under fair use (published less than 50 years ago); Series 15 –17: omitted due to copyright issues (published less than 50 years ago)

===== Series 17 =====
On the occasion of there being now 10 kings within the current dynasty. The central bank of Thailand decided that this series would commemorate all the kings of the Chakri dynasty. The front depicting the King Rama X, while the back depict 2 kings. While initially, the series was printed on cotton-paper, on 24 March 2022, the central bank decided to upgrade the material to polymer. This would set a trend where more denominations are converted into polymer. On 21 November 2025, the 50-baht and 100-baht notes were converted into polymer.

Series 17 banknotes (Rama X) issuing for 8 years
| Value | Dimensions | Main colour | Description | | Date of issue |
| Value | Dimensions | Main colour | Obverse | Reverse | Date of issue |
|---|---|---|---|---|---|
| 20 baht | 138 × 72 mm | Green | King Vajiralongkorn (Rama X) in the uniform of the commander of the Royal Thai Air Force and wearing the Order of the Nine Gems | King Phutthayotfa Chulalok (Rama I) and King Phutthaloetla Naphalai (Rama II) | 6 April 2018 |
| 50 baht | 144 × 72 mm | Blue | King Vajiralongkorn (Rama X) in the uniform of the commander of the Royal Thai Air Force and wearing the Order of the Nine Gems | King Nangklao (Rama III) and King Mongkut (Rama IV) | 6 April 2018 |
| 100 baht | 150 × 72 mm | Red | King Vajiralongkorn (Rama X) in the uniform of the commander of the Royal Thai Air Force and wearing the Order of the Nine Gems | King Chulalongkorn (Rama V) and King Vajiravudh (Rama VI) | 6 April 2018 |
| 500 baht | 156 × 72 mm | Purple | King Vajiralongkorn (Rama X) in the uniform of the commander of the Royal Thai Air Force and wearing the Order of the Nine Gems | King Prajadhipok (Rama VII) and King Ananda Mahidol (Rama VIII) | 28 July 2018 |
| 1,000 baht | 162 × 72 mm | Brown | King Vajiralongkorn (Rama X) in the uniform of the commander of the Royal Thai Air Force and wearing the Order of the Nine Gems | King Bhumibol Adulyadej (Rama IX) and King Vajiralongkorn (Rama X) | 28 July 2018 |

== Money and unit of mass ==
Ngoen (เงิน) is Thai for "silver" as well as the general term for money, reflecting the fact that the baht (or tical) is foremost a unit of weight for precious metals and gemstones. One baht = 15.244 grams. Since the standard purity of Thai gold is 96.5%, the actual gold content of one baht by weight is 15.244 × 0.965 = 14.71046 grams; equivalent to about 0.473 troy ounces. 15.244 grams is used for bullion; in the case of jewellery, one baht should be more than 15.16 grams.

=== Historical coinage material ===
| Example coin | Material | Date in use | Denomation minted |
|---|---|---|---|
| | Gold | 1863–1905* *the coins mintage date were only in 1863 & 1876, but they were demonitised by the decimalisation. | Predecimal coinage: 1/4 baht (1 fueang); 1/2 baht; 1 baht; 2 baht; 4 baht (1 tamlueng); 2 tamlueng |
| | Silver | 1860–1962 | Predecimal coinage: 1/2 fueang; 1/4 baht (1 fueang); 1/2 baht; 1 baht; 2 baht; Decimal coinage: 5 satang; 10 satang; 20 satang; 25 satang; 50 satang; 1 baht |
| | Tin | 1860–1950 | Predecimal coinage: 1/16 fueang; 1/8 fueang; Decimal coinage: 1 satang; 5 satang; 10 satang; 25 satang; 50 satang |
| | Copper | 1865–1905 | Predecimal coinage: 1/16 fueang; 1/8 fueang; 1/4 fueang; 1/2 fueang |
| | Brass | 1865–1977 | Predecimal coinage: 1/4 fueang; 1/2 fueang; Decimal coinage: 25 satang |
| | Bronze | 1887–1957 | Predecimal coinage: 1/16 fueang; 1/8 fueang; 1/4 fueang; Decimal coinage: 1/2 satang; 1 satang; 5 satang; 10 satang |
| | Nickel | 1908–1937 | Decimal coinage: 5 satang; 10 satang |
| | Aluminium bronze | 1950–present | Decimal coinage: 5 satang; 10 satang; 25 satang; 50 satang |
| | Cupronickel | 1897–present | Transitional coinage: 2 1/2 satang; 5 satang; 10 satang; 20 satang; Decimal coinage: 1 baht; 5 baht; 10 baht (outer ring) |
| | Nickel-plated steel | 2005–present | Decimal coinage: 1 baht; 2 baht |
| *inner part | Copper-aluminium-nickel | 2008–present | Decimal coinage: 5 baht; 10 baht (inner plug) |
| *no wiki-image exist a Al-Br coin version is used | Copper-plated steel | 2008–present | Decimal coinage: 25 satang; 50 satang |
This table only includes milled coins. Photduang, knife-cash, etc., are not included.

== Exchange rates ==
Historical exchange rate of USD/THB from 1980 to 2015

Historical exchange rate of EUR/THB since 2005

The Bank of Thailand adopted a series of exchange controls on 19 December 2006, which resulted in a significant divergence between offshore and onshore exchange rates, with spreads of up to 10% between the two markets. Controls were broadly lifted on 3 March 2008, and there is now no significant difference between offshore and onshore exchange rates.

USD/THB average exchange rate
| 2000 | 2001 | 2002 | 2003 | 2004 | 2005 | 2006 | 2007 | 2008 | 2009 |
| 40.24 | 40.26 | 37.92 | 32.34 | 32.99 | 34.34 | 31.73 | 30.48 | 31.07 | 30.71 |
| 2010 | 2011 | 2012 | 2013 | 2014 | 2015 | 2016 | 2017 | 2018 | 2019 |
| 32.48 | 34.25 | 35.28 | 33.91 | 32.48 | 34.25 | 35.30 | 33.94 | 32.31 | 31.05 |
| 2020 | 2021 | 2022 | 2023 | 2024 | 2025 | 2026 | 2027 | 2028 | 2029 |
| 31.30 | 31.98 | 35.06 | 34.80 | 35.29 | 32.88 | | | | |
Source 1999–2013: usd.fx-exchange.com; Source 2014–2020: Bank of Thailand; Source 2021–2025: Bank of Thailand

Current THB exchange rates
| From Google Finance: | AUD CAD CHF CNY EUR GBP HKD JPY USD INR TWD |
| From Yahoo! Finance: | AUD CAD CHF CNY EUR GBP HKD JPY USD INR TWD |
| From XE.com: | AUD CAD CHF CNY EUR GBP HKD JPY USD INR TWD |
| From OANDA: | AUD CAD CHF CNY EUR GBP HKD JPY USD INR TWD |

=== Historical Exchange Rate in 1900s ===
Due to the fact that during these time periods, often the currencies were non-decimals, hence the non-decimal notations for these currencies.

| Notation | Meaning | Notation | Meaning |
| Decimal | | Non Decimal | |
|---|---|---|---|
| ℳ︁1.15 | 1 Mark 15 Pfennig | ฿17/6/1 | 17 Baht 6 Fuang 1 Att |
| ¥0.55 | 0 Yen 55 Sen | £0/1/1½ | 0 Pound 1 Shilling 1½ Penny |
| 0.68ƒ | 0 Gulden 68 Cents | Rs.1/6/2 | 1 Rupee 6 Annas 2 Paisa |

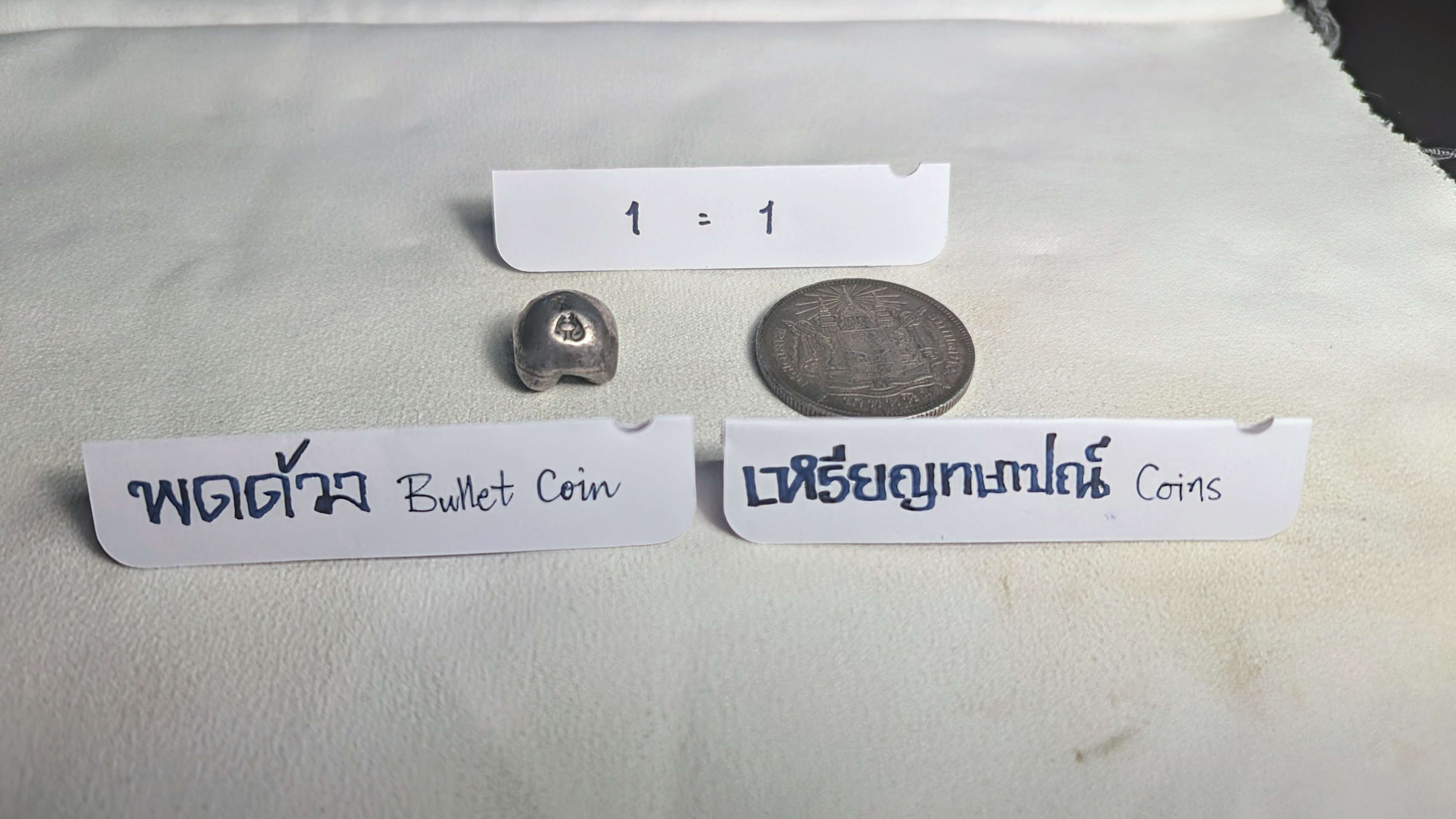
Podduang to Flatcoins (฿1=฿1)

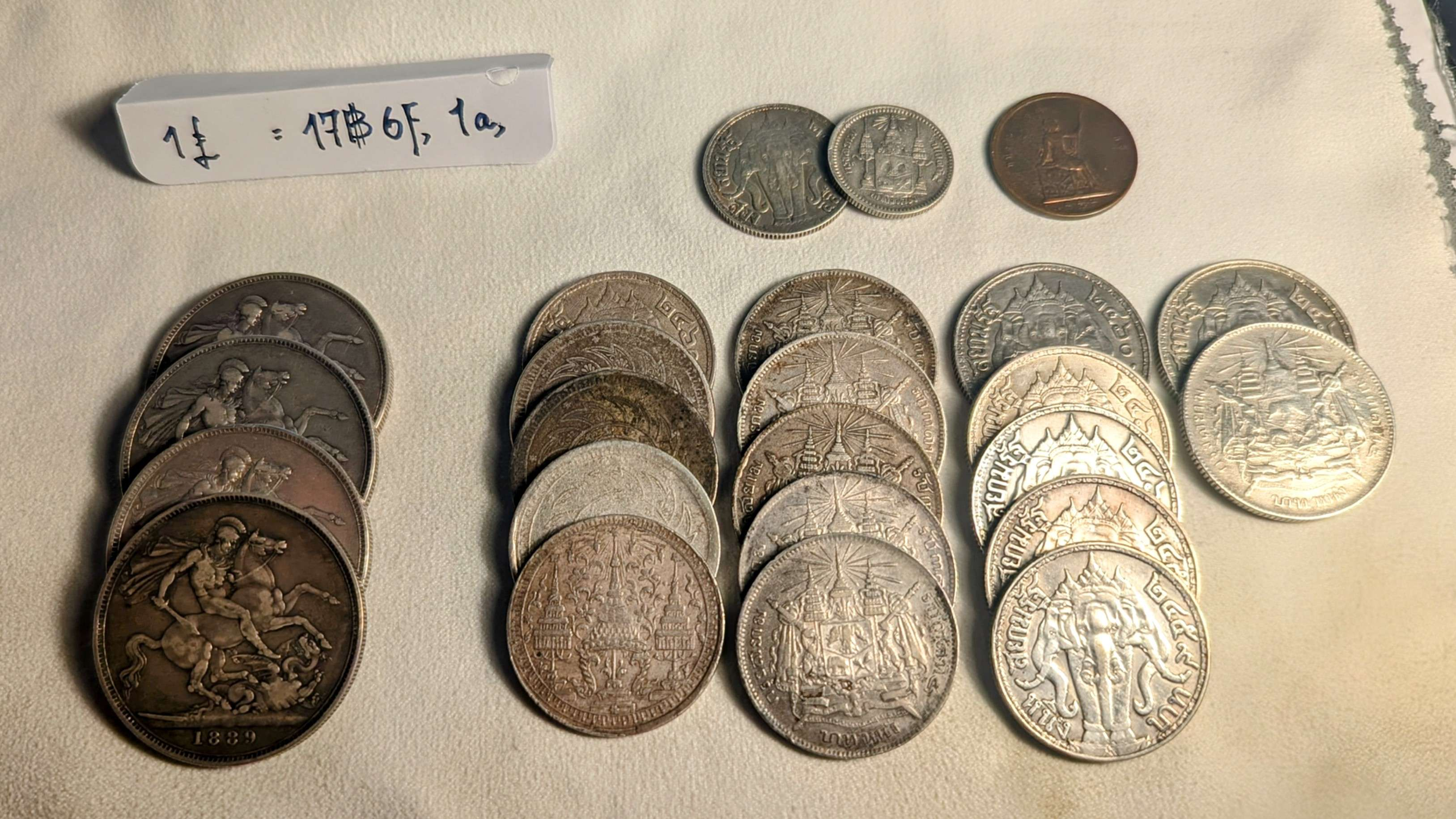
British pound £ (lsd) to THB (£1=฿17/6/1)

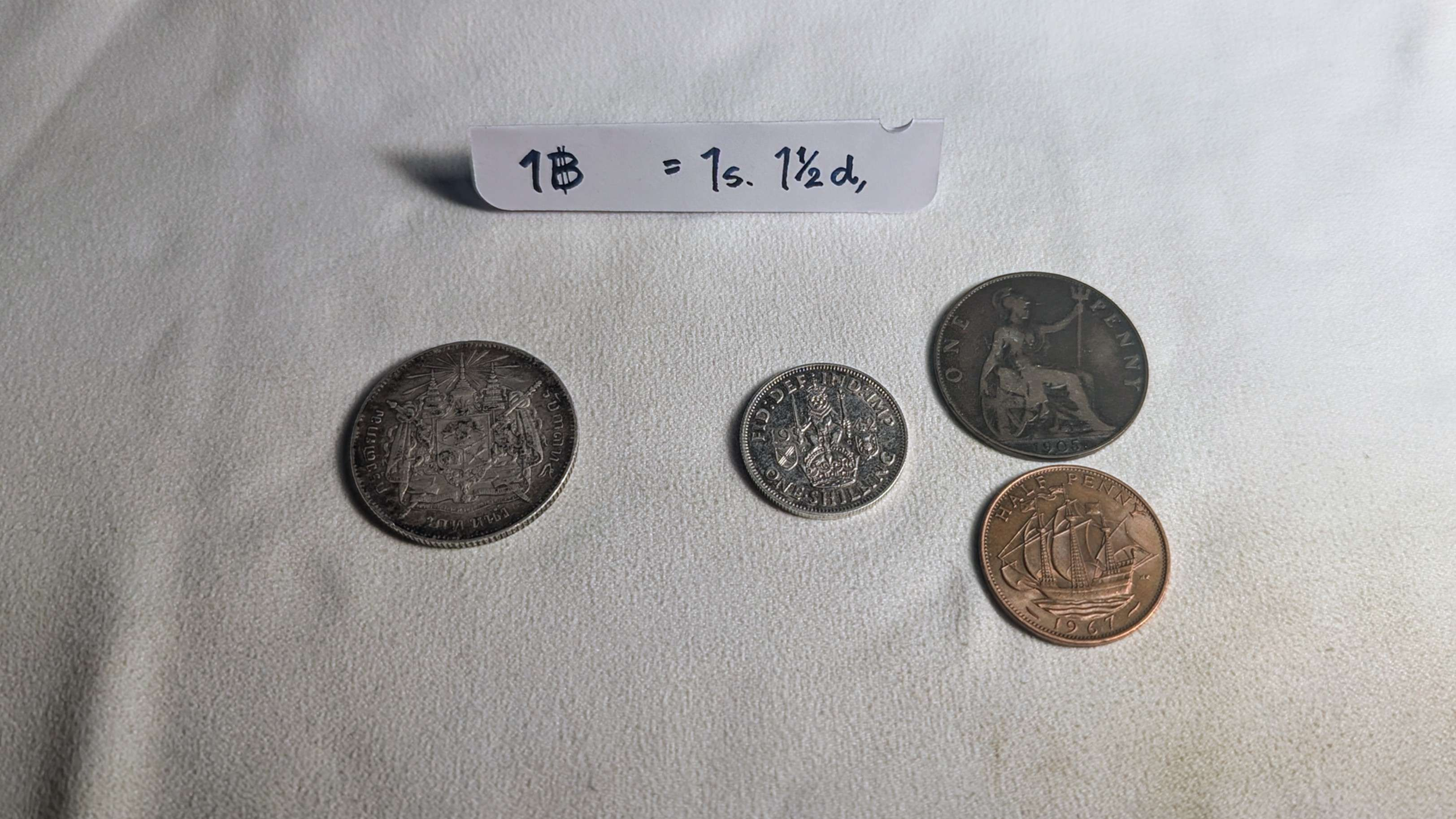
THB to British pound £ (lsd) (฿1=£0/1/1½)

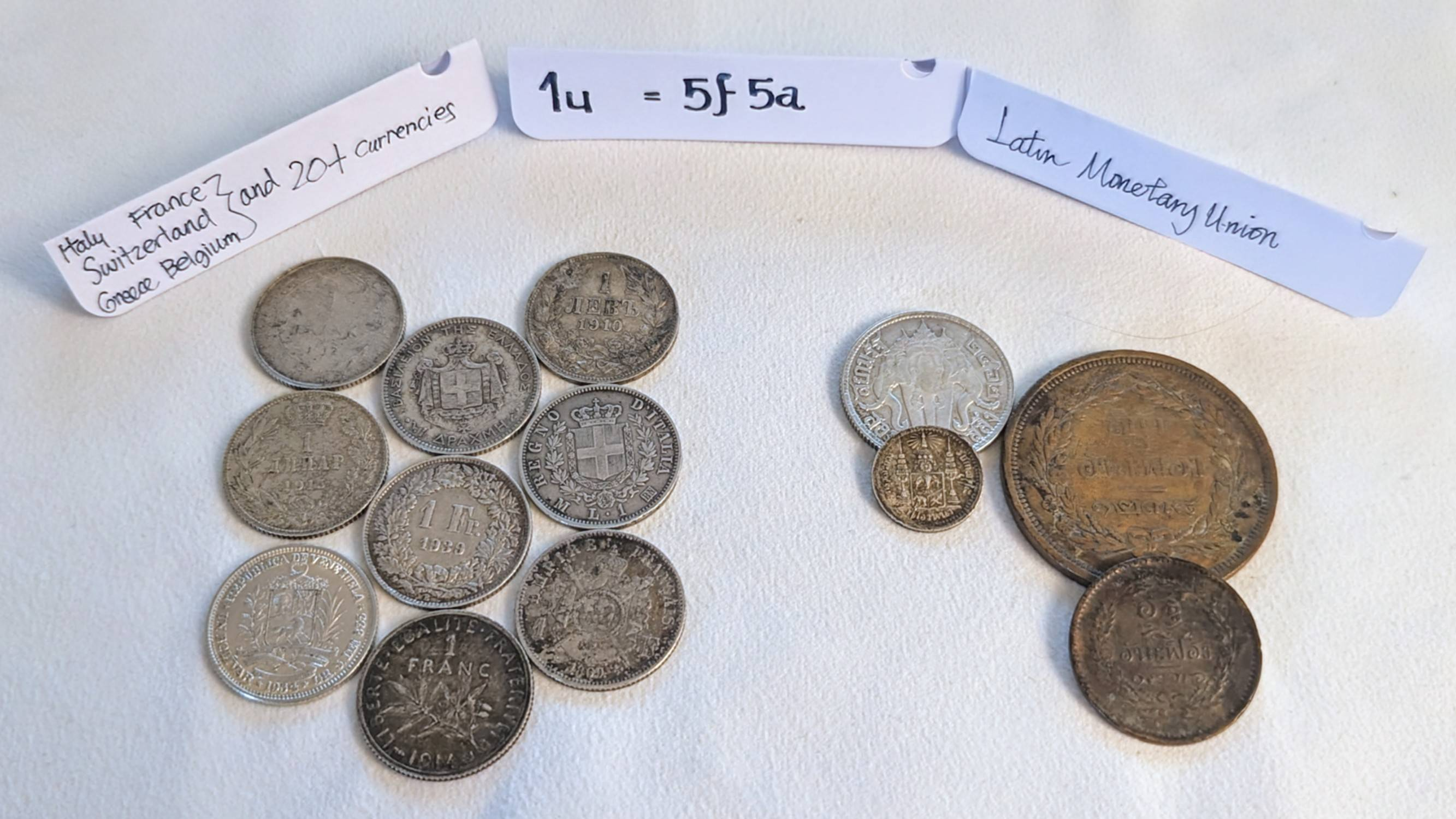
Latin Monetary Union unit to THB (1=฿0/5/5)

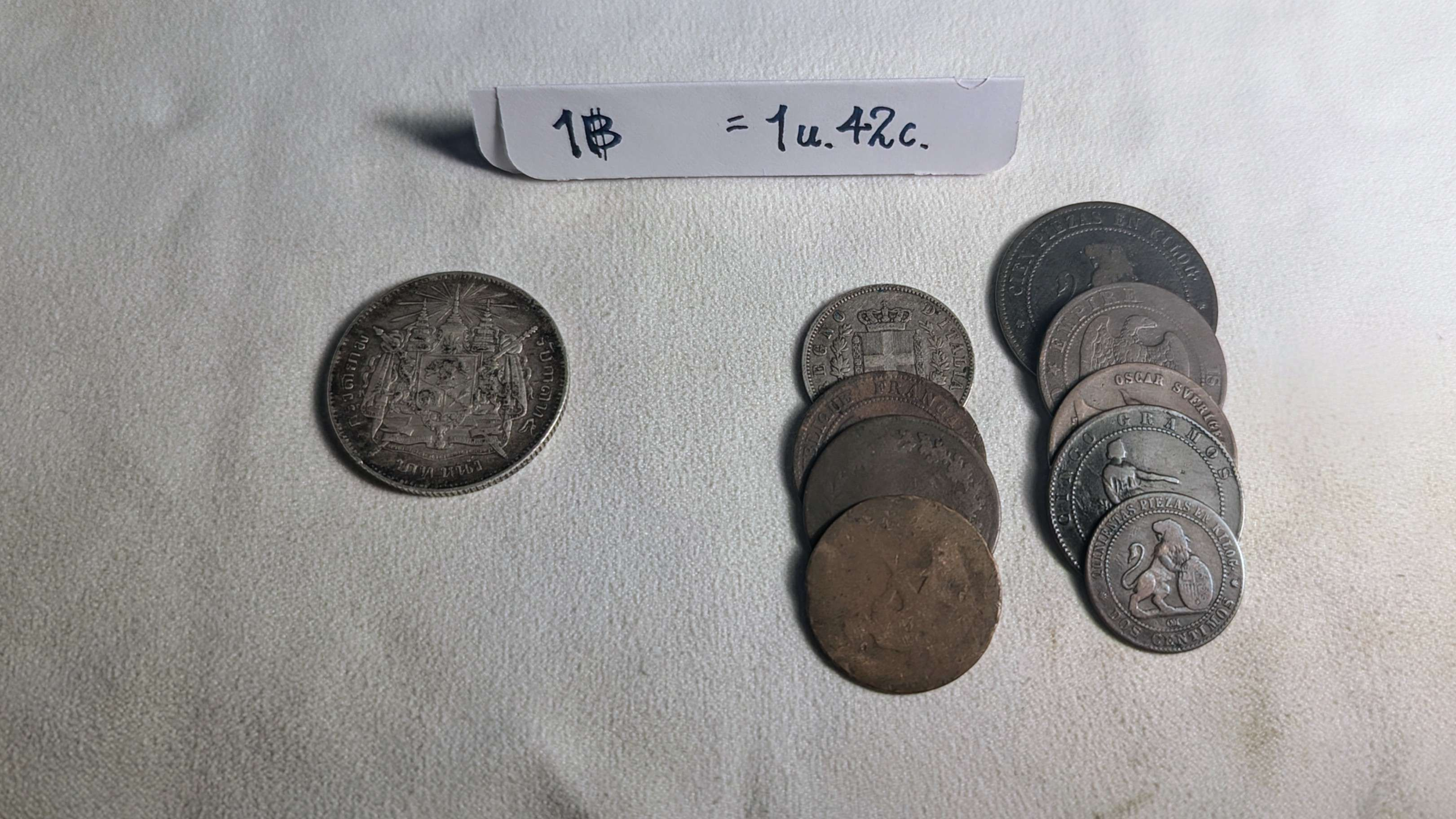
THB to Latin Monetary Union unit (฿1=1.42)

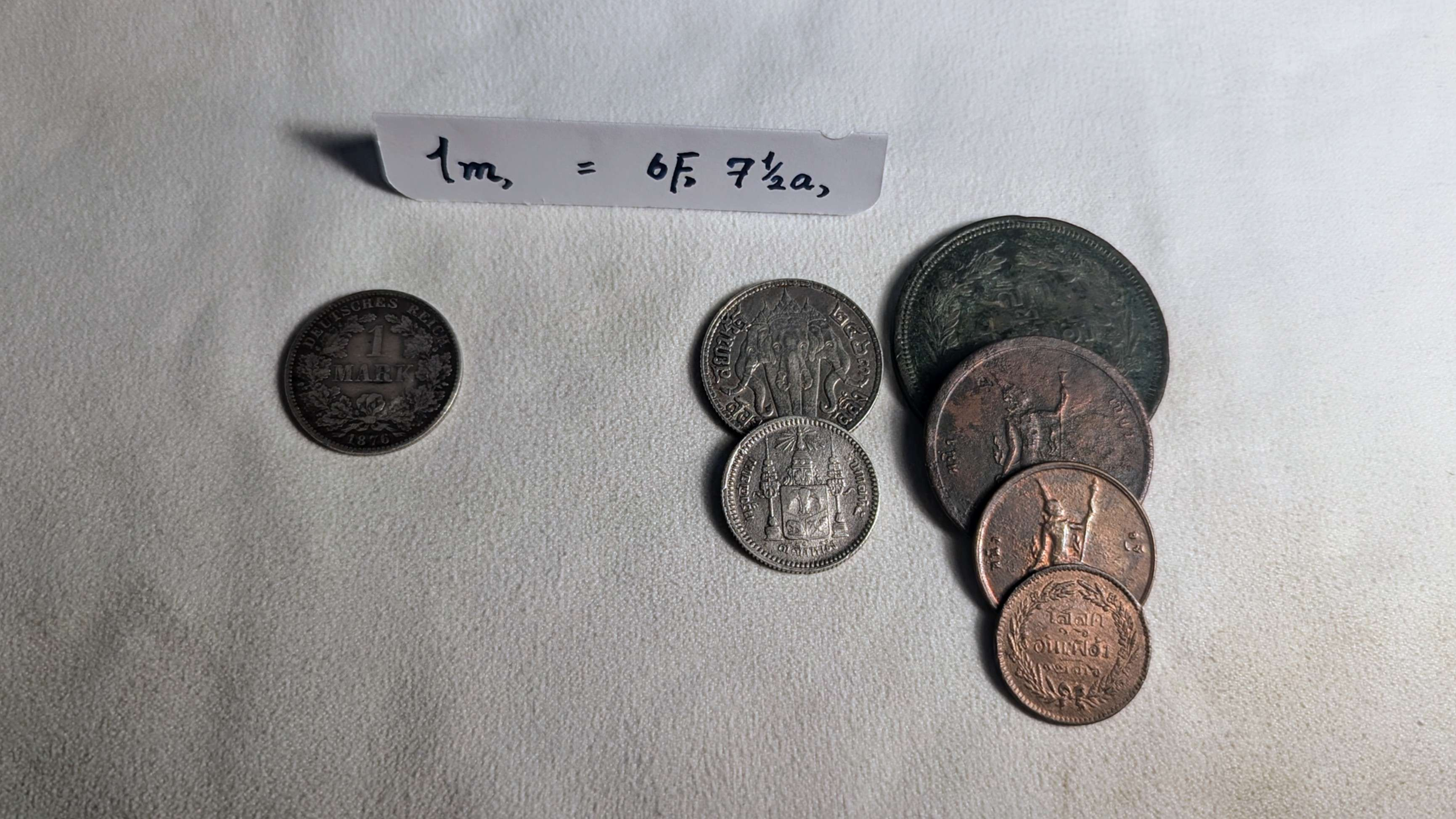
Deutsche Mark to THB (ℳ︁1=฿0/6/7½)

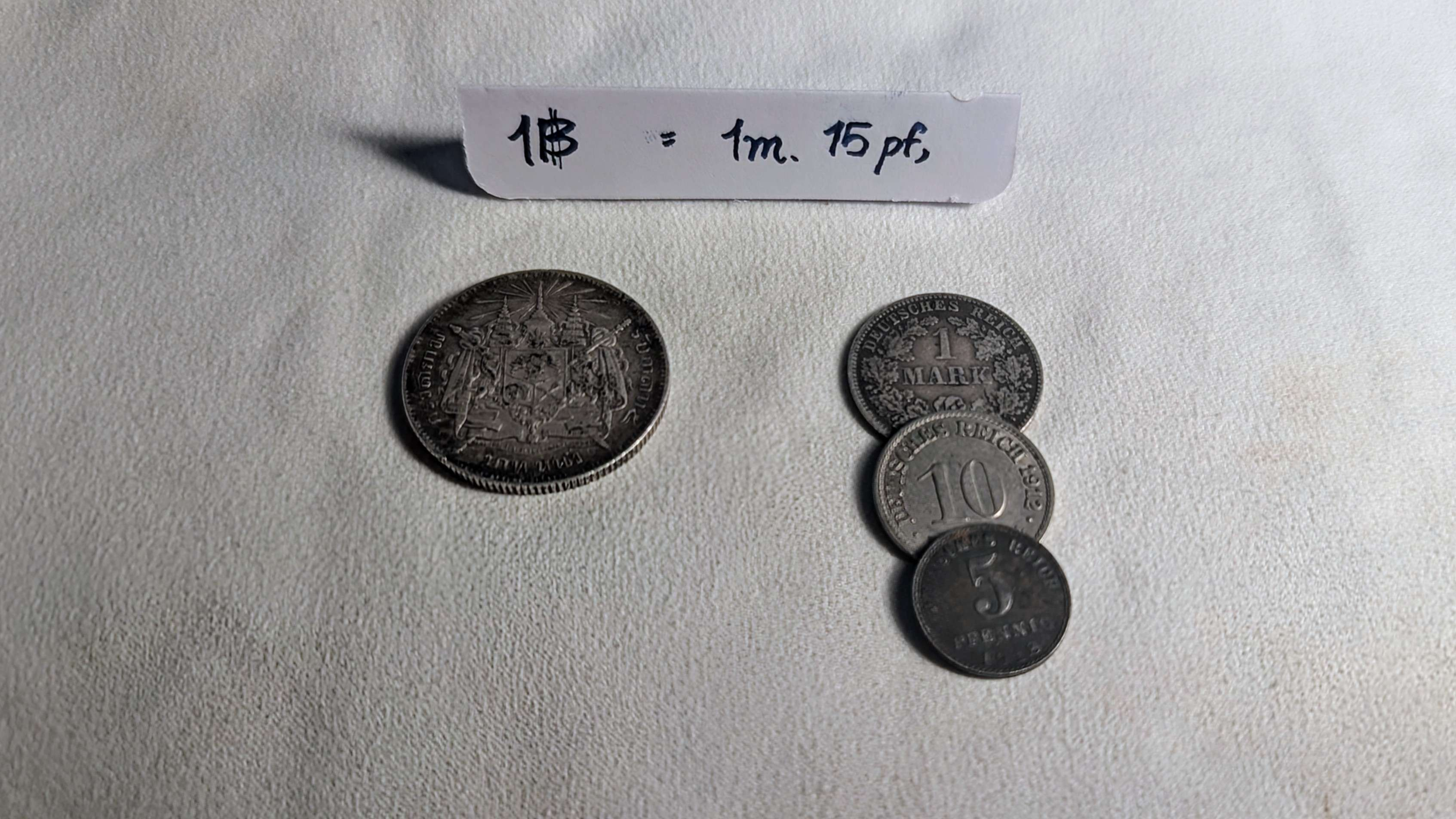
THB to Deutsche Mark (฿1=ℳ︁1.15)

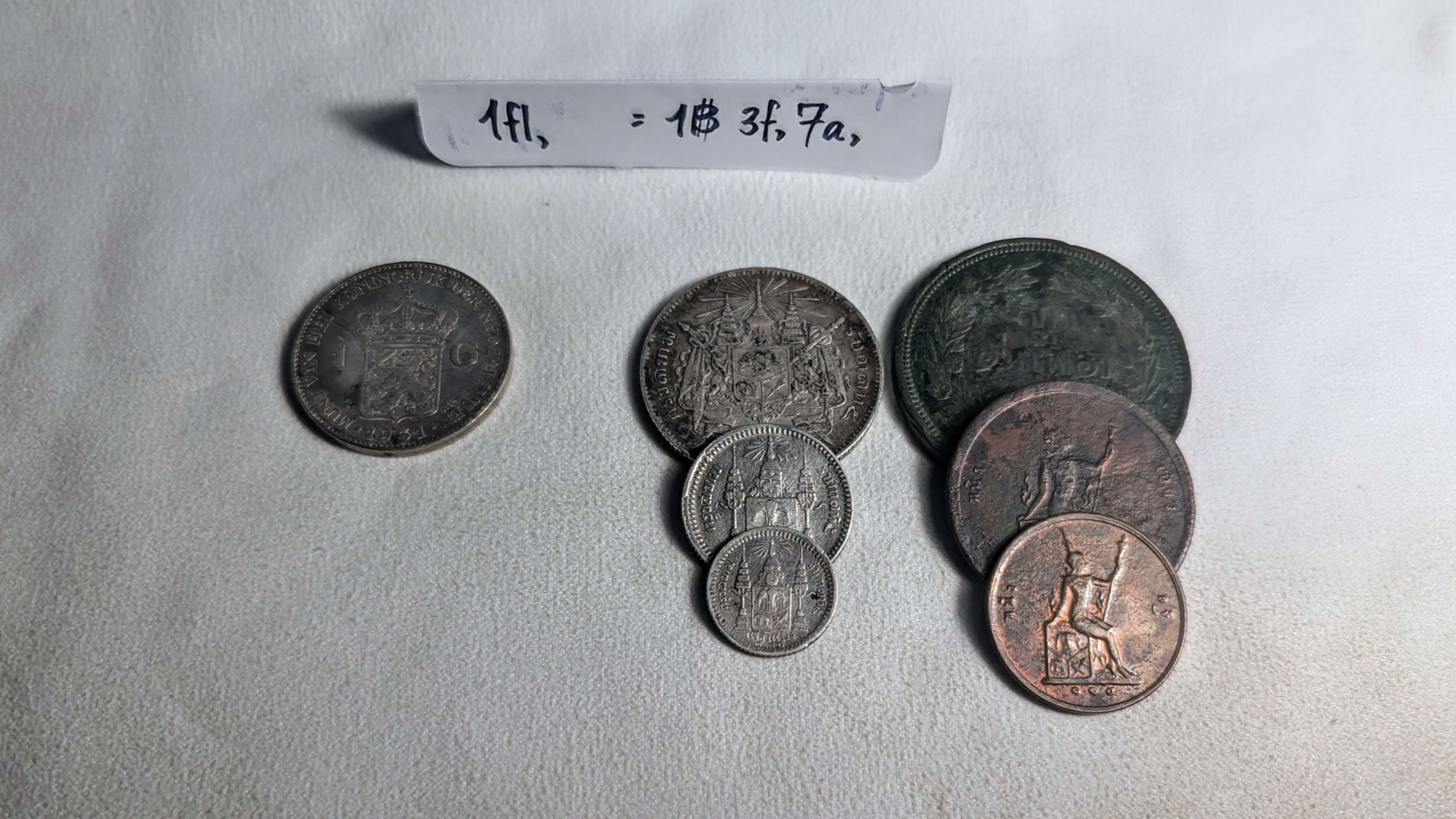
Dutch gulden to THB (1ƒ=฿1/3/7)

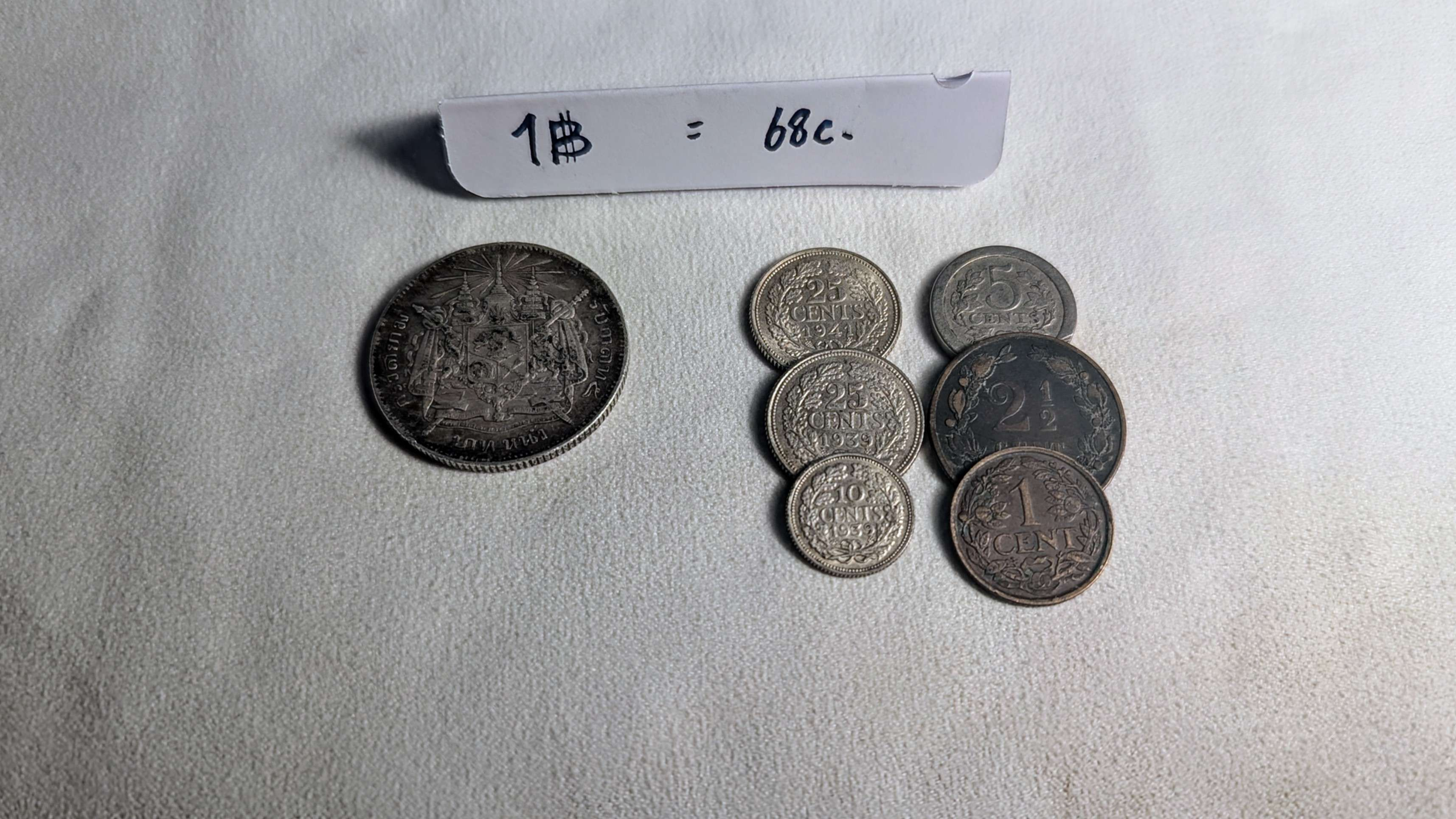
THB to Dutch gulden (฿1=0.68ƒ)

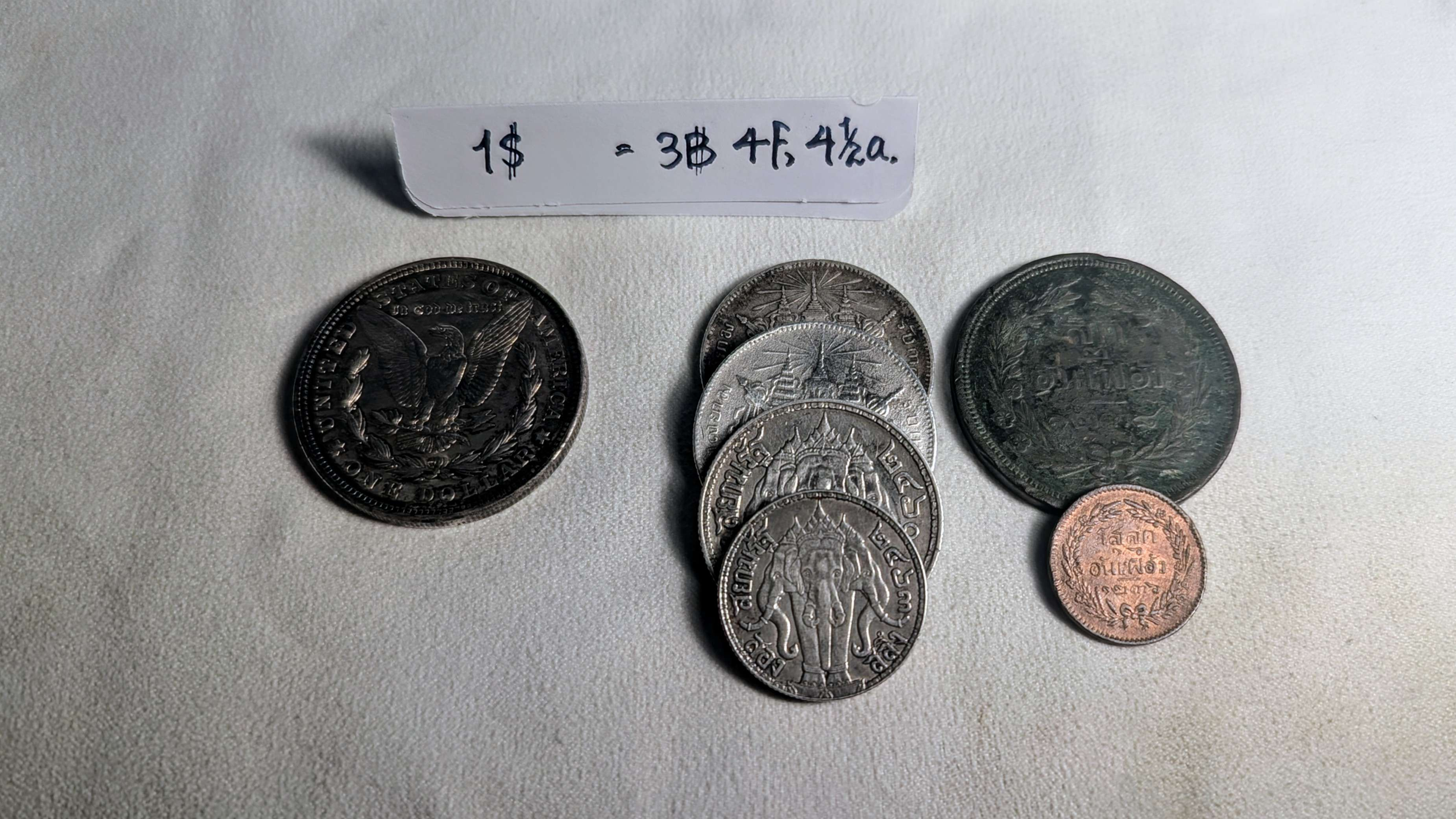
USD to THB ($1=฿3/4/4½)

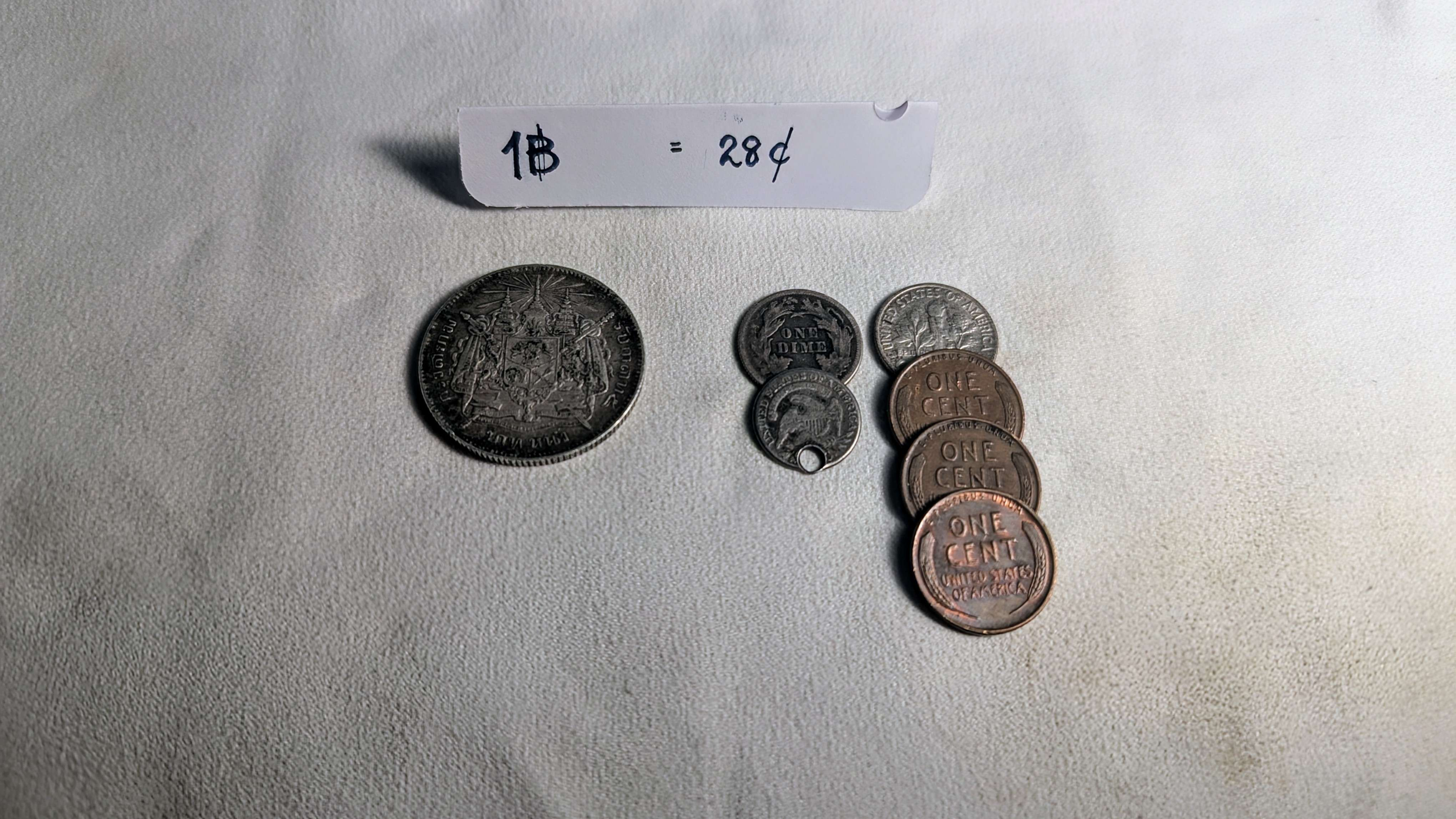
THB to USD (฿1=$0.28)

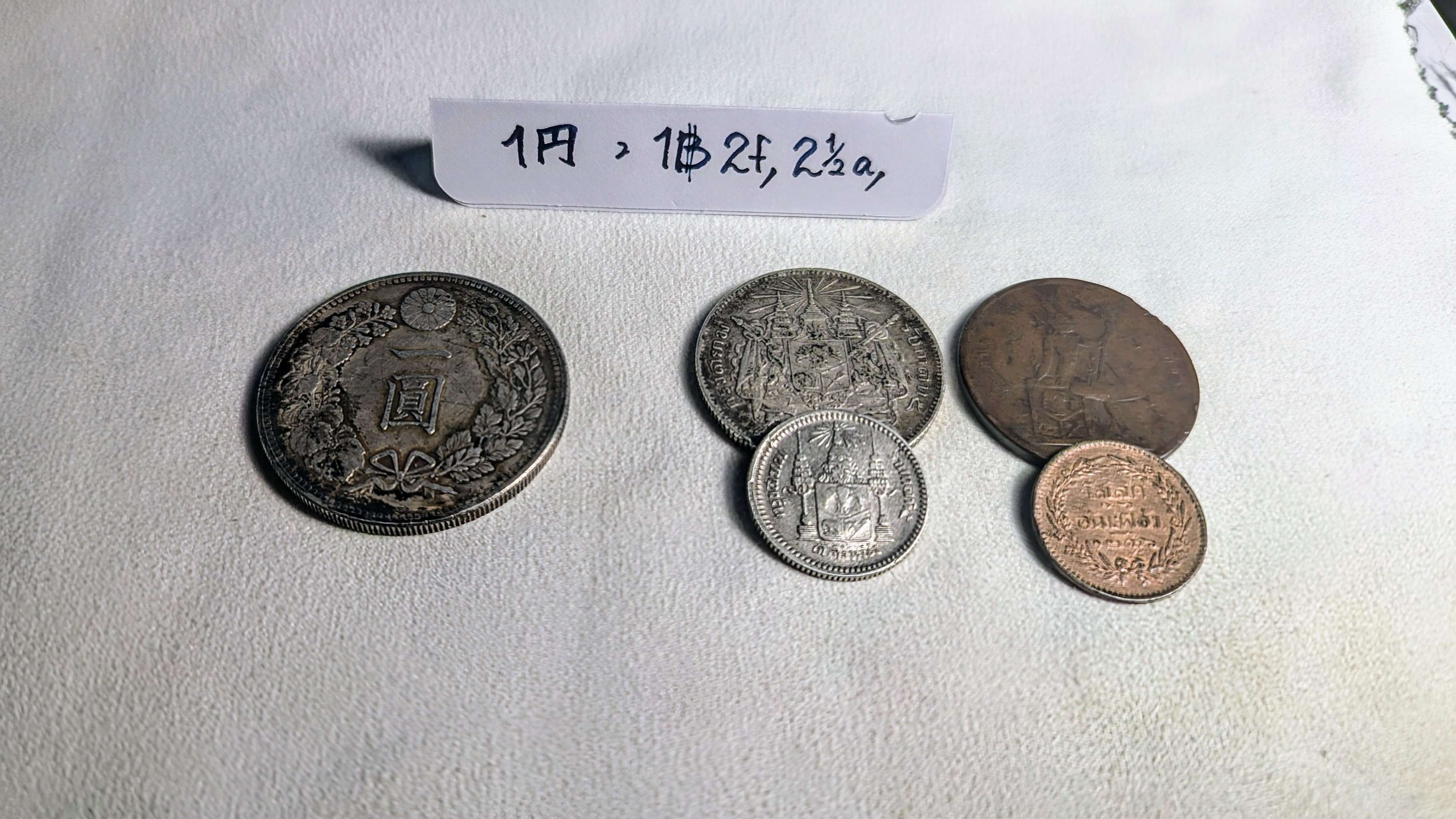
JPY to THB (¥1=฿1/2/2½)

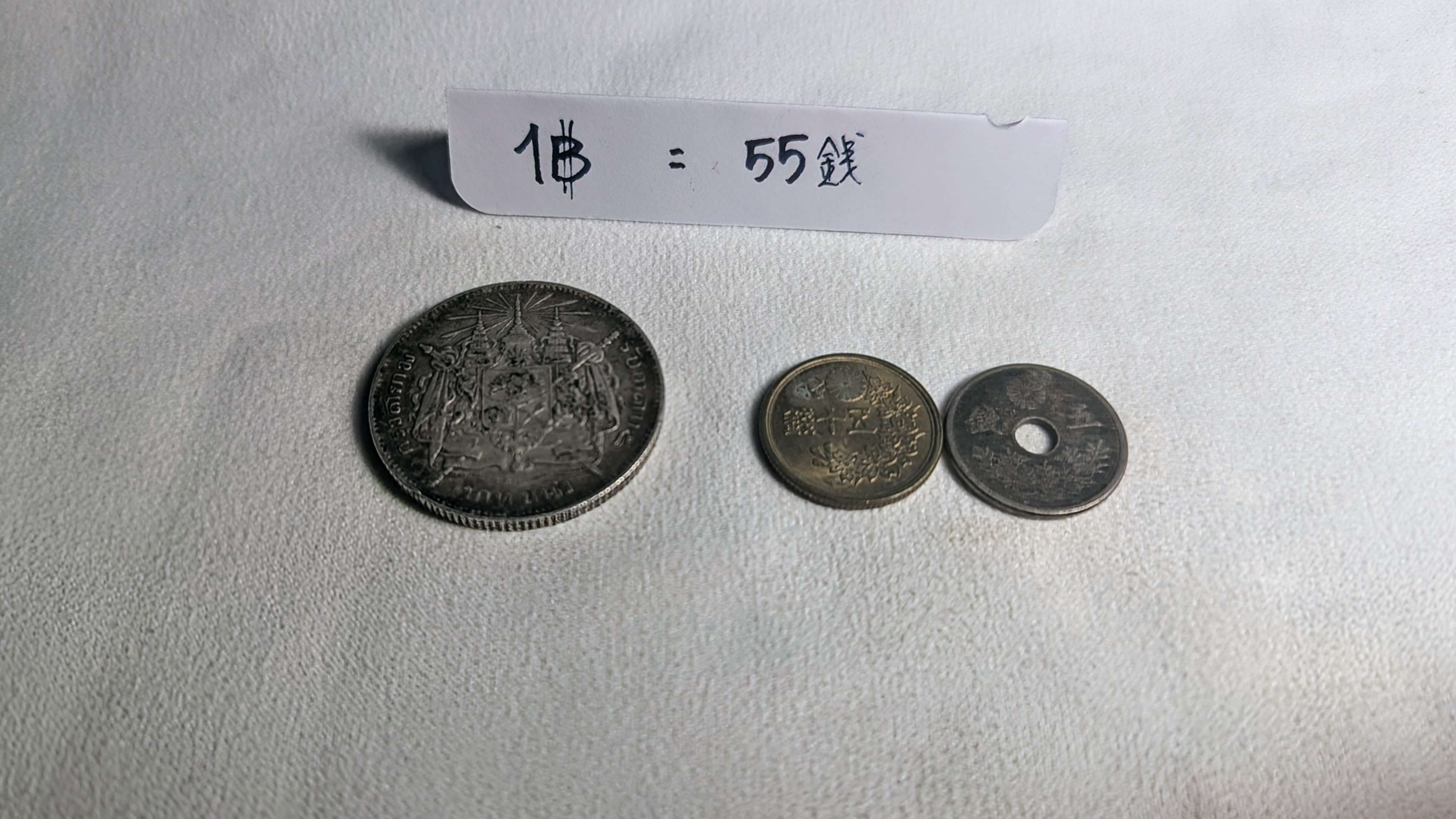
THB to JPY (฿1=¥0.55)

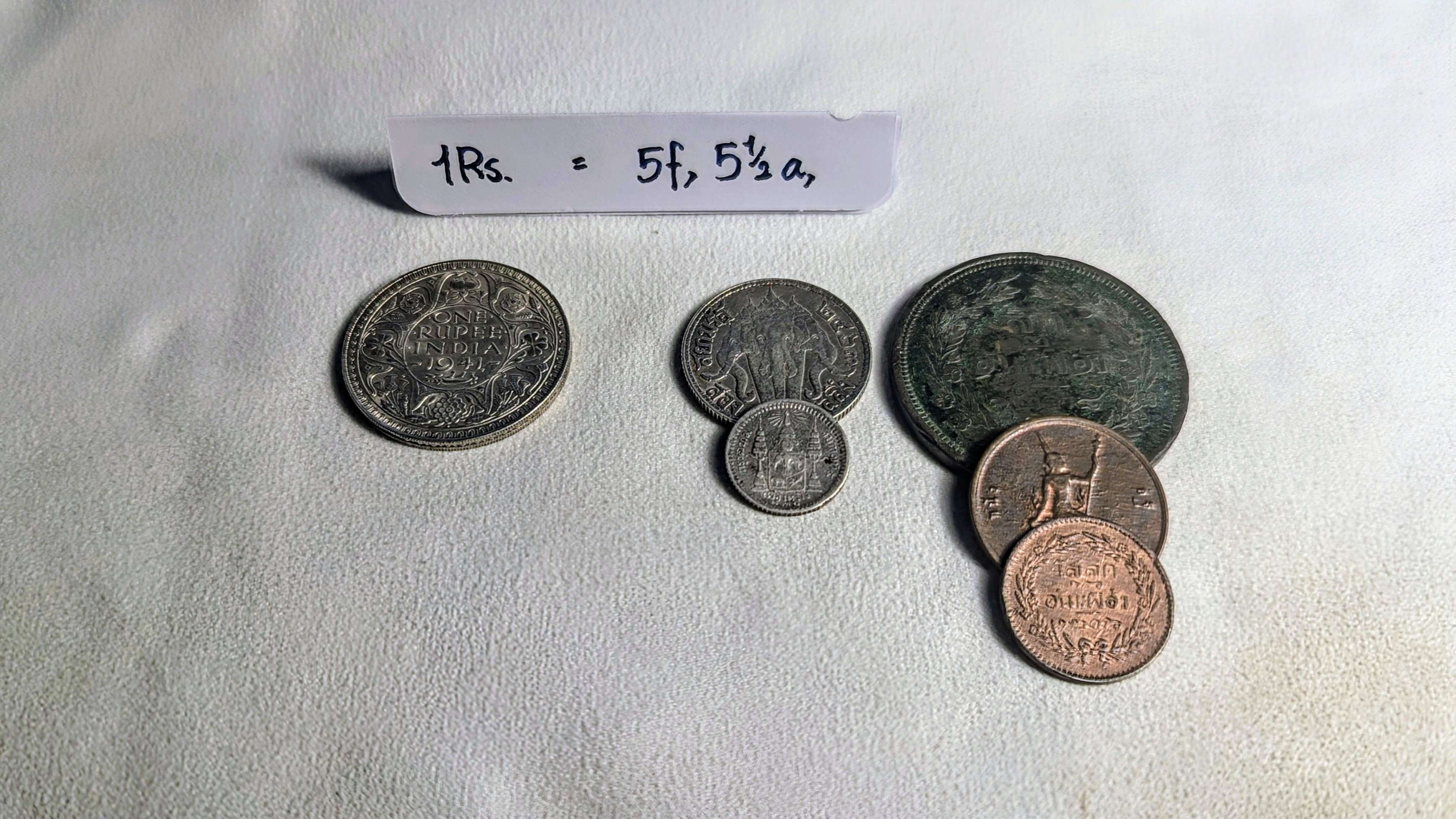
INR (British Raj) to THB (Rs.1=฿0/5/5½)

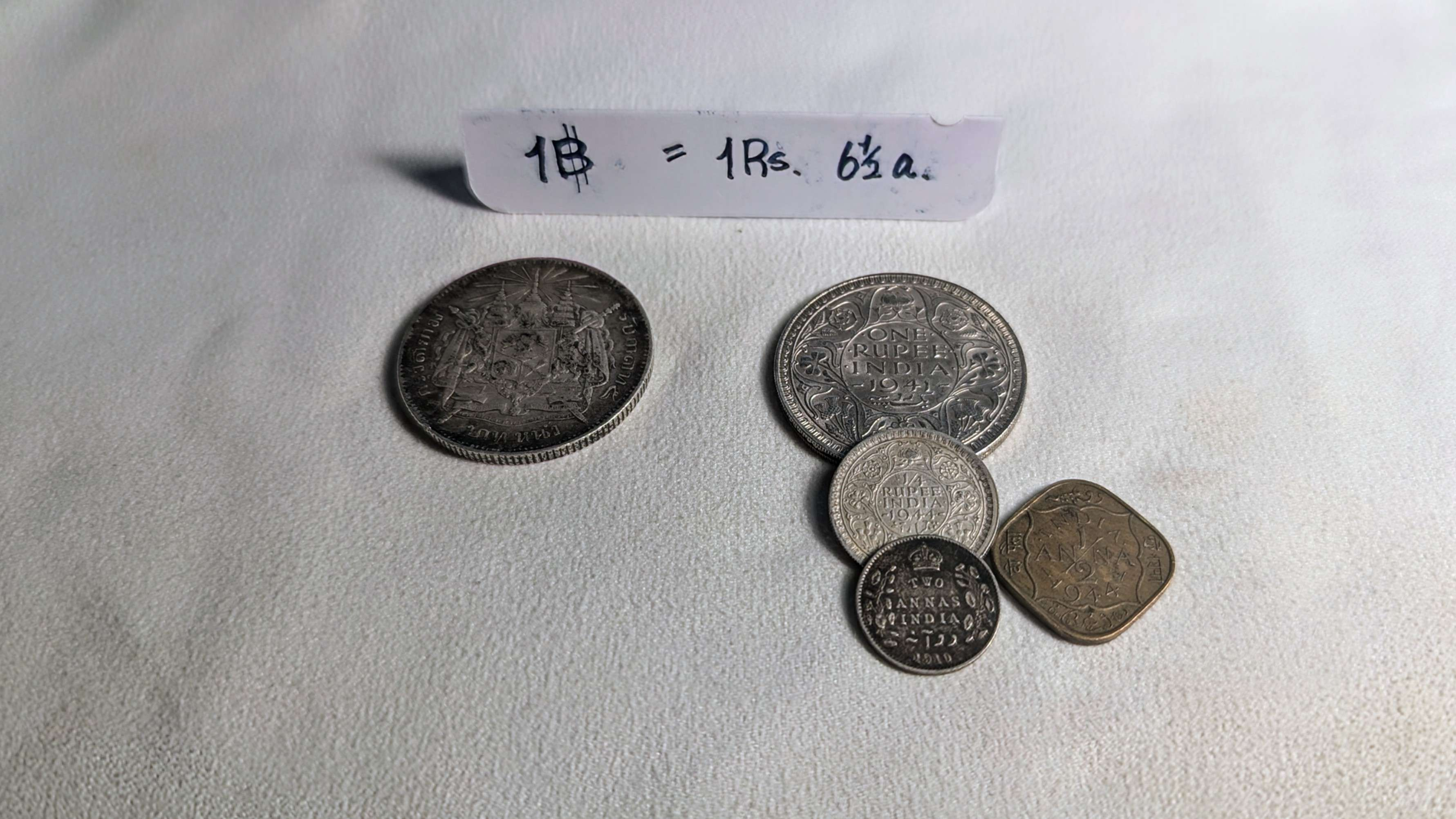
THB to INR (British Raj) (฿1=Rs.1/6/2)

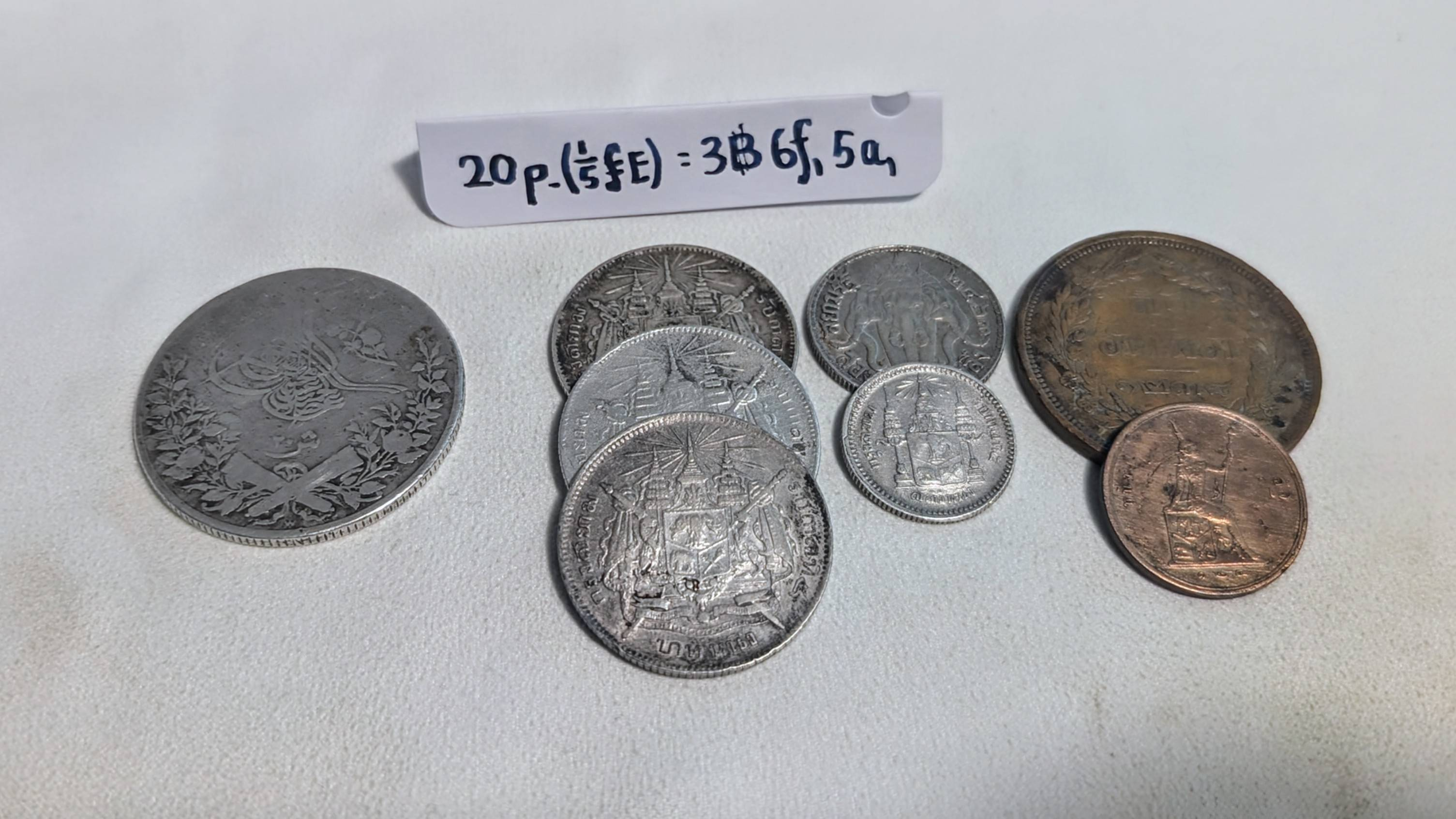
Egyptian Lira to THB (£E1/5=฿3/6/5)

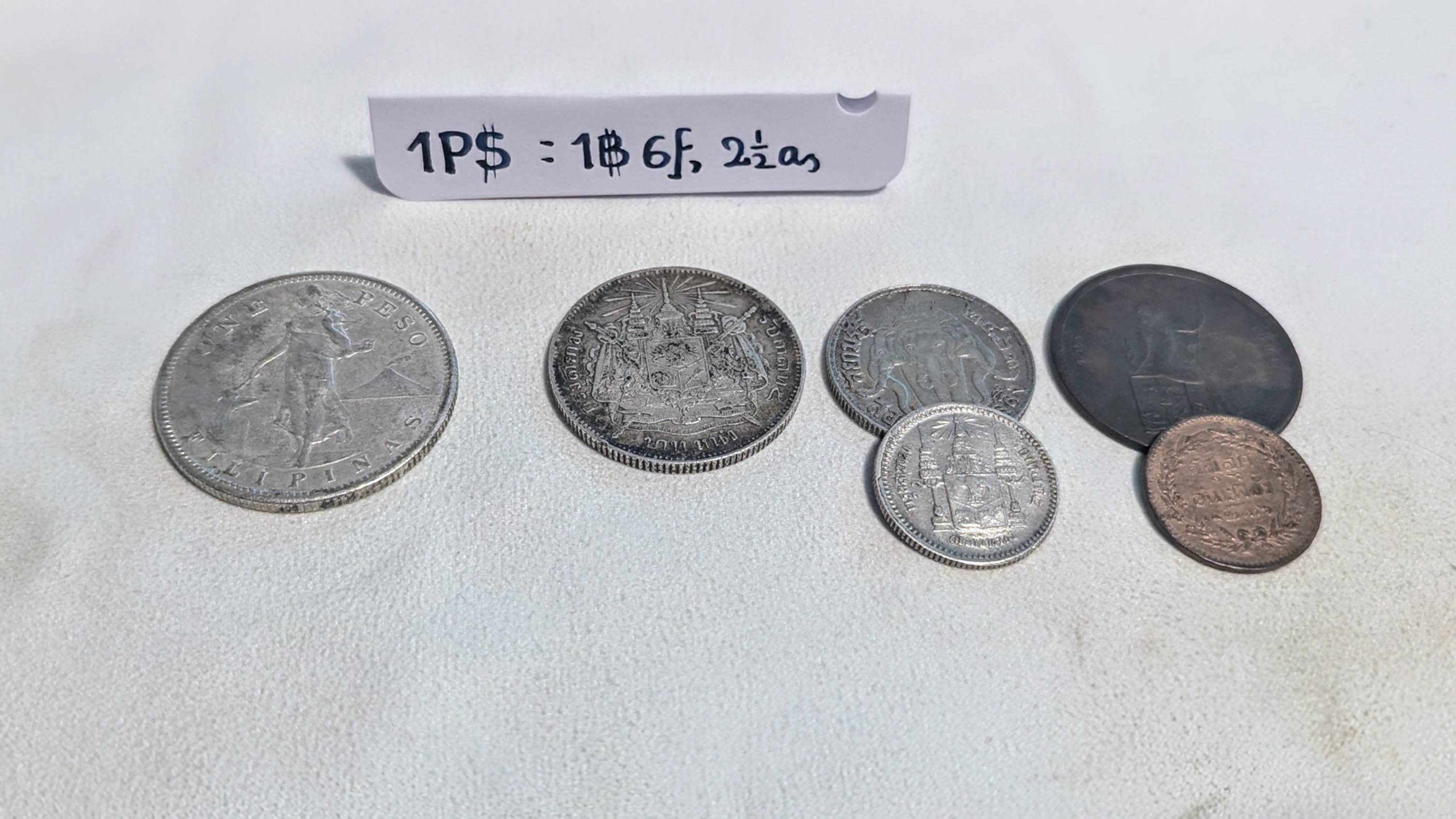
Philippine peso to THB (P$1=฿1/6/2½)

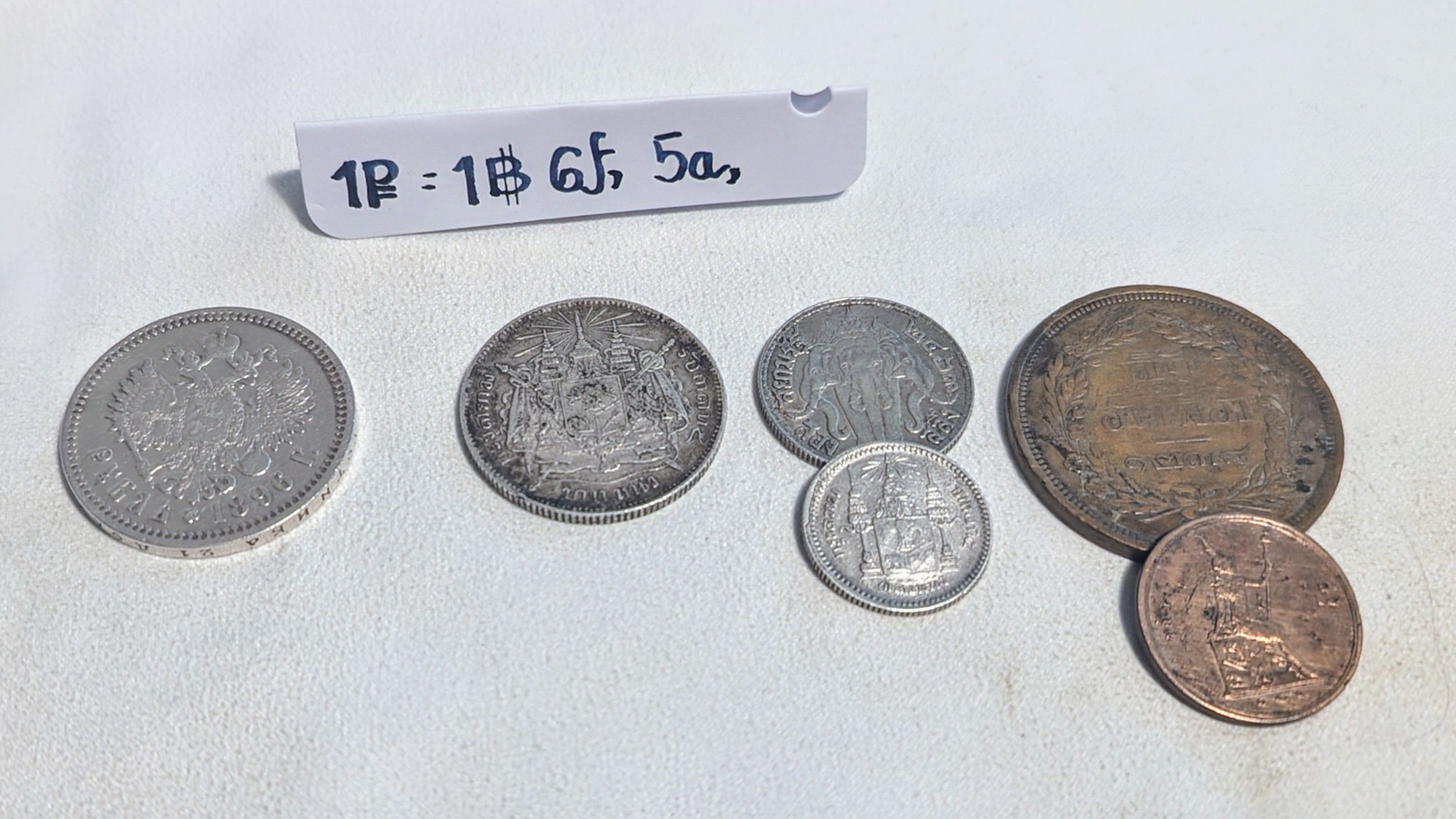
Imperial ruble to THB (₽1=฿1/6/5)

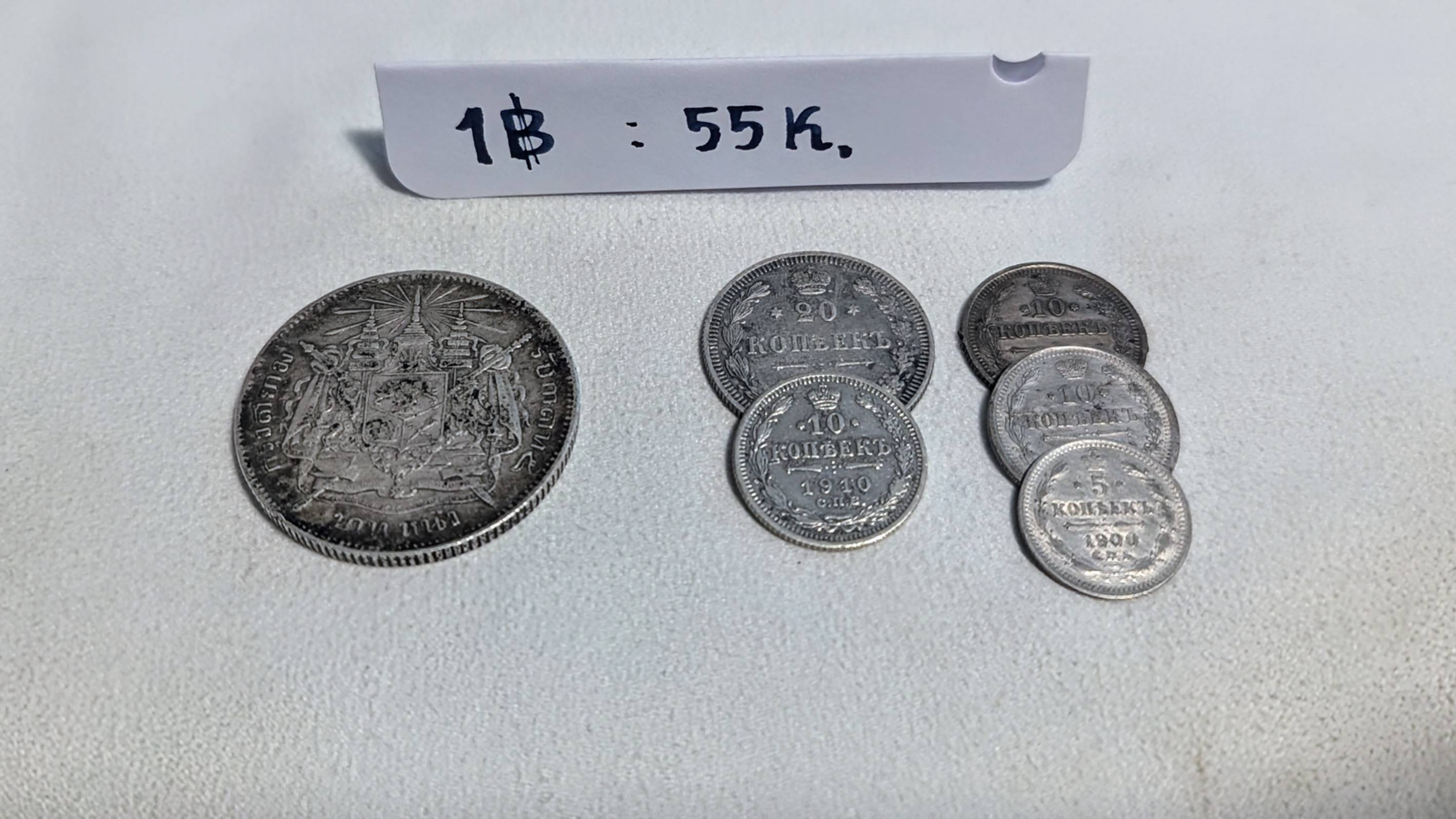
THB to Imperial ruble (฿1=₽0.55)

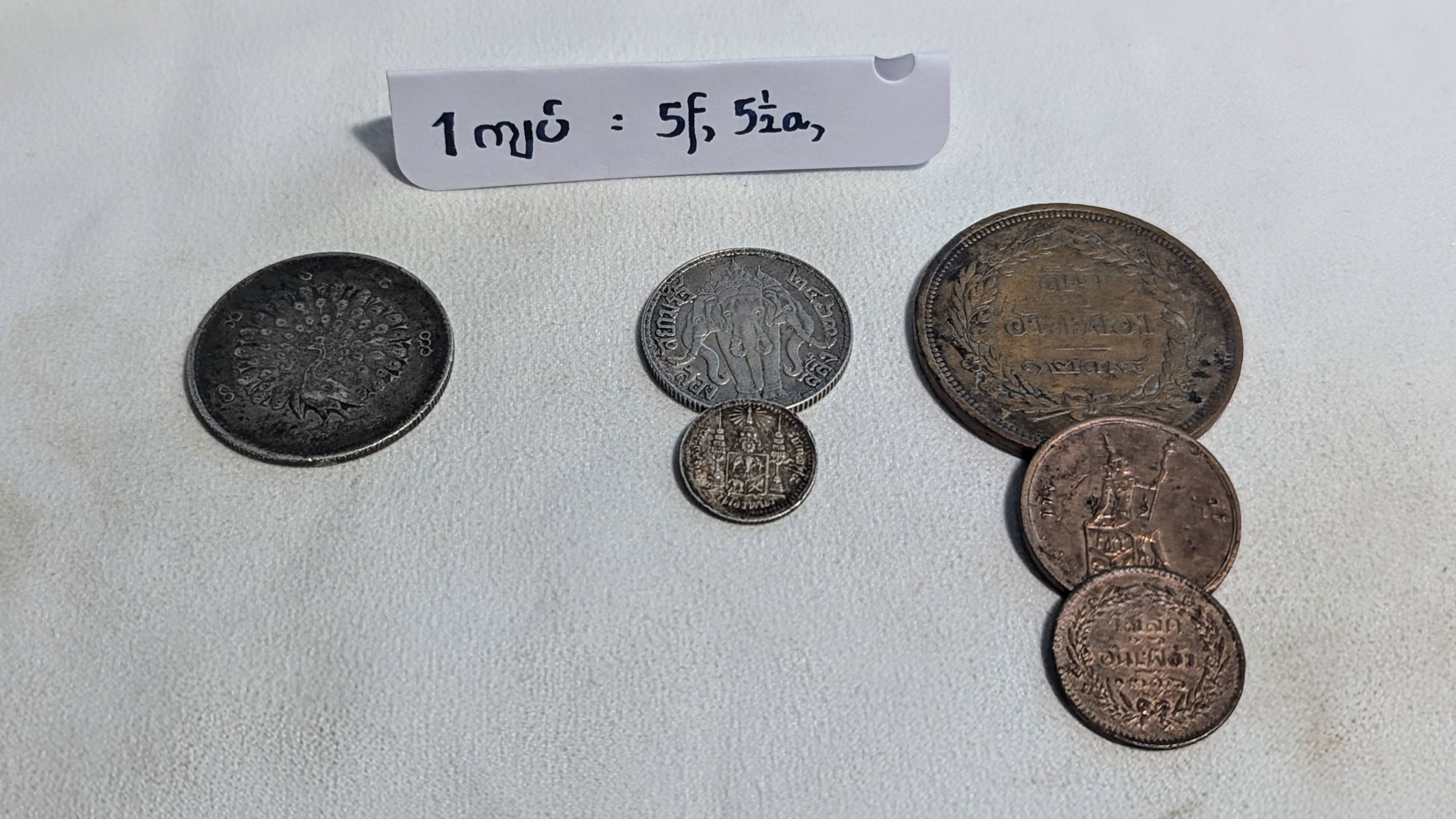
Konbaung Kyat to THB (1ကျပ်=฿0/5/5½)

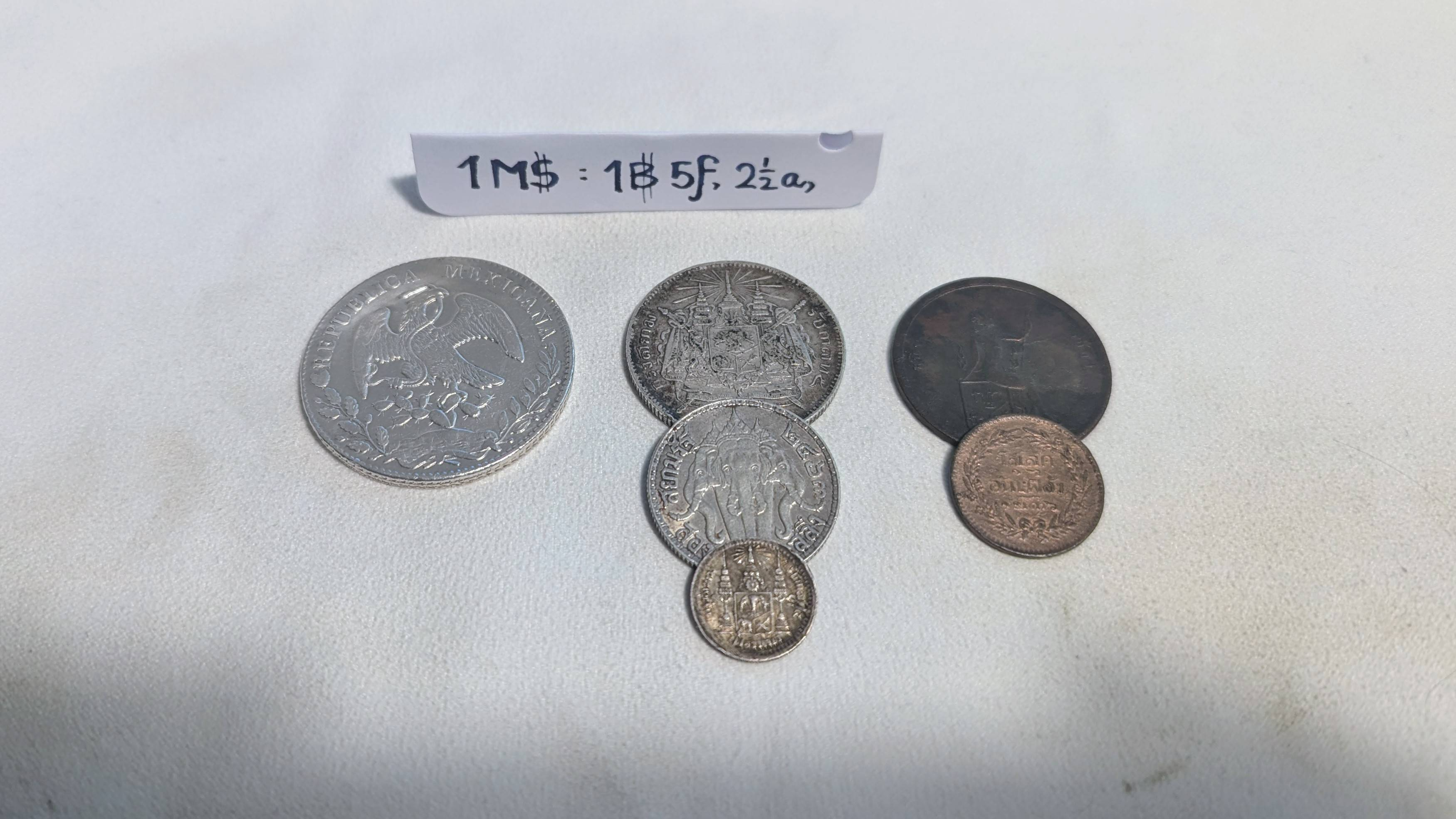
Mexican peso to THB (M$1=฿1/5/2½)

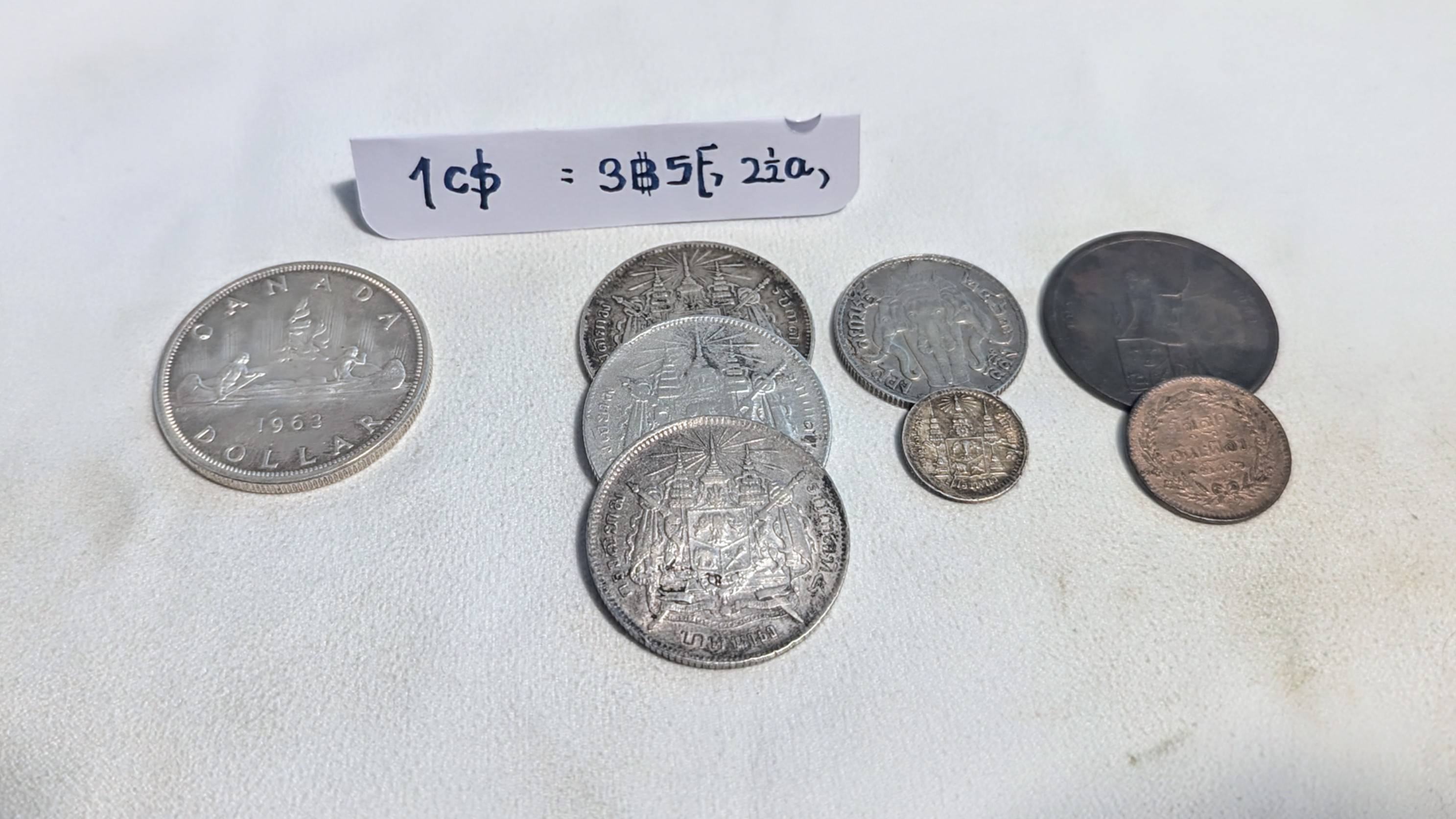
Canadian dollar to THB (C$1=฿3/5/2½)

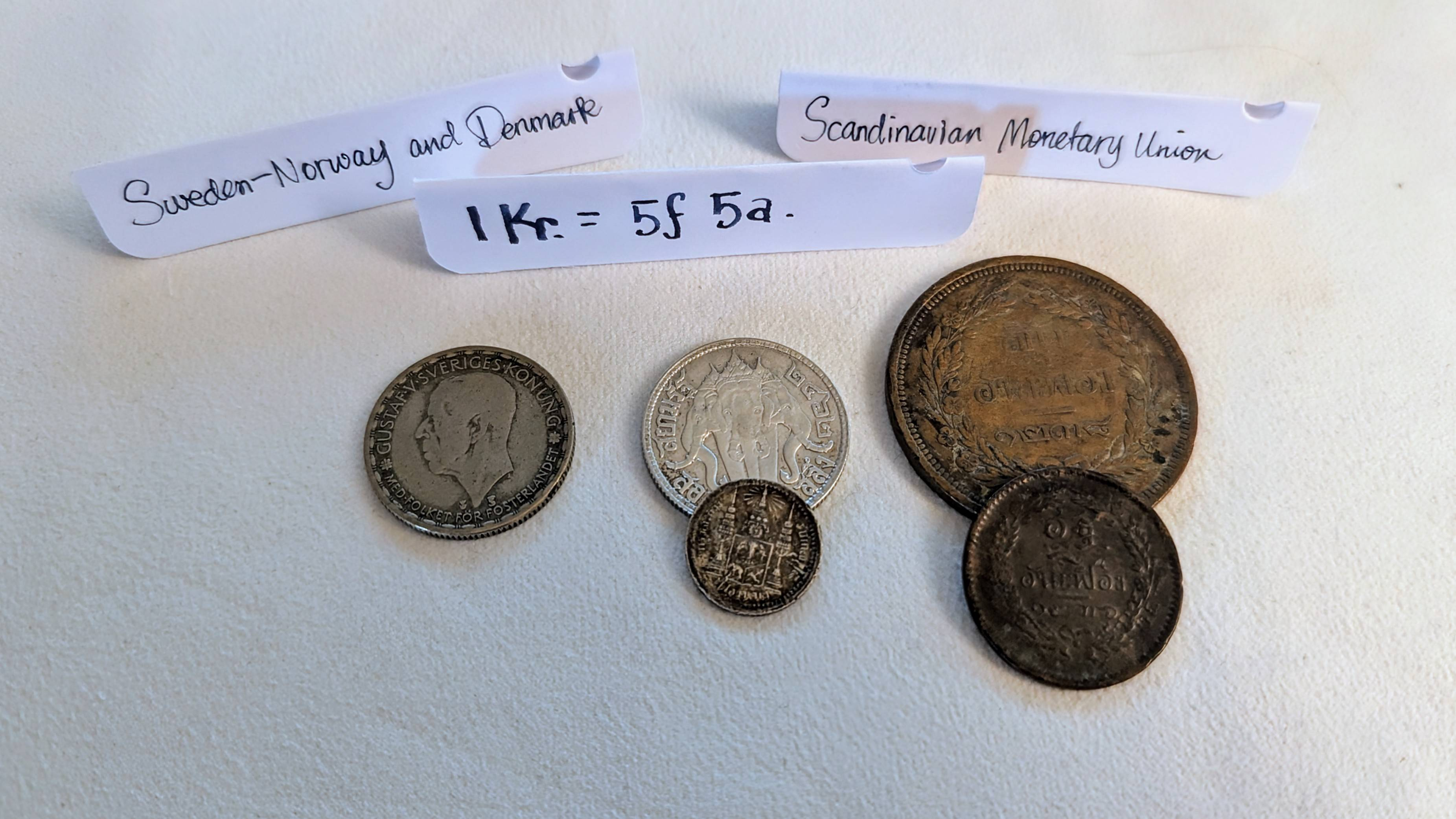
Scandinavian Monetary Unit to THB (SKr.1=฿0/5/5)

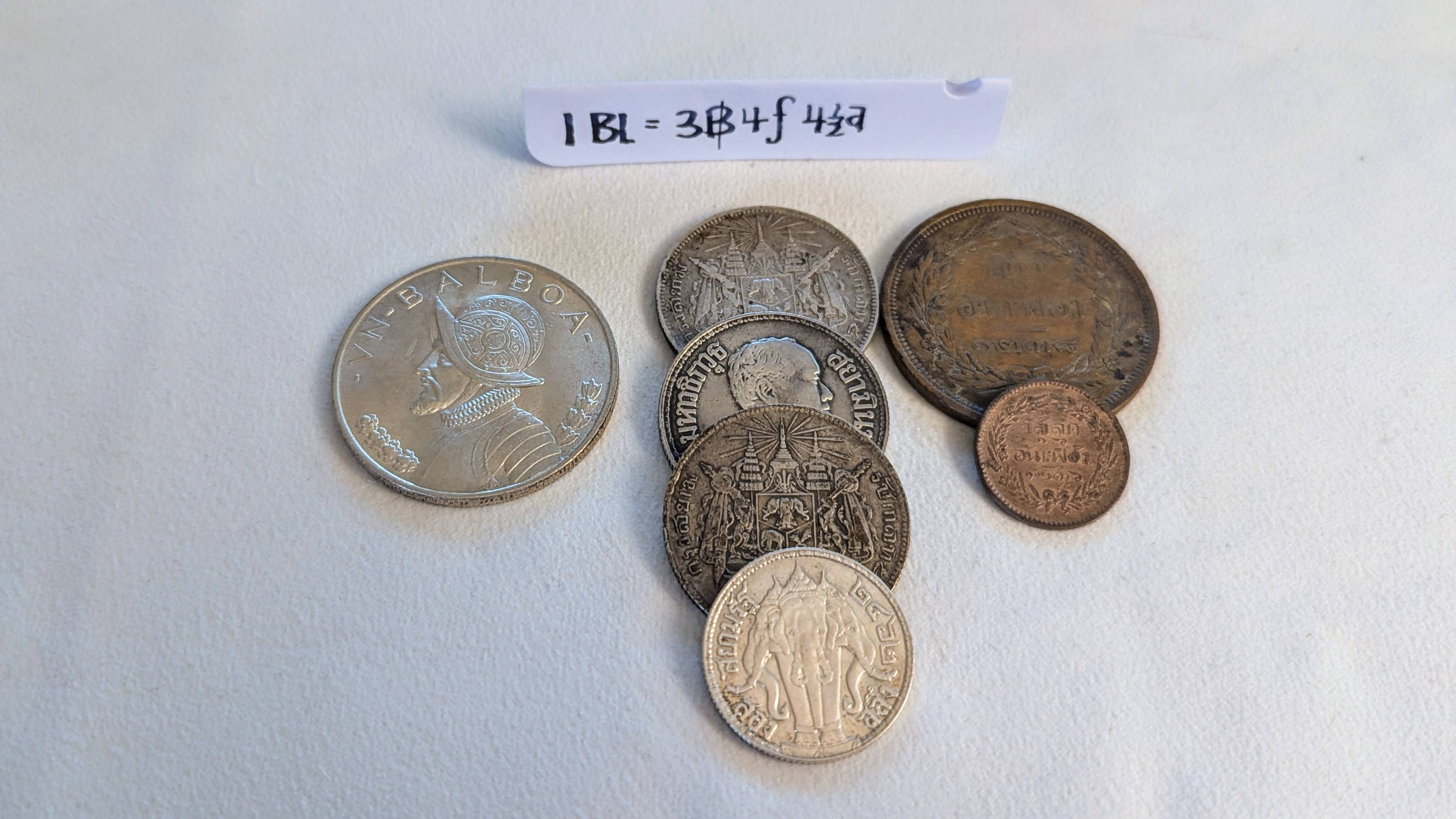
Panamanian balboa to THB (B/.1=฿3/4/4½)

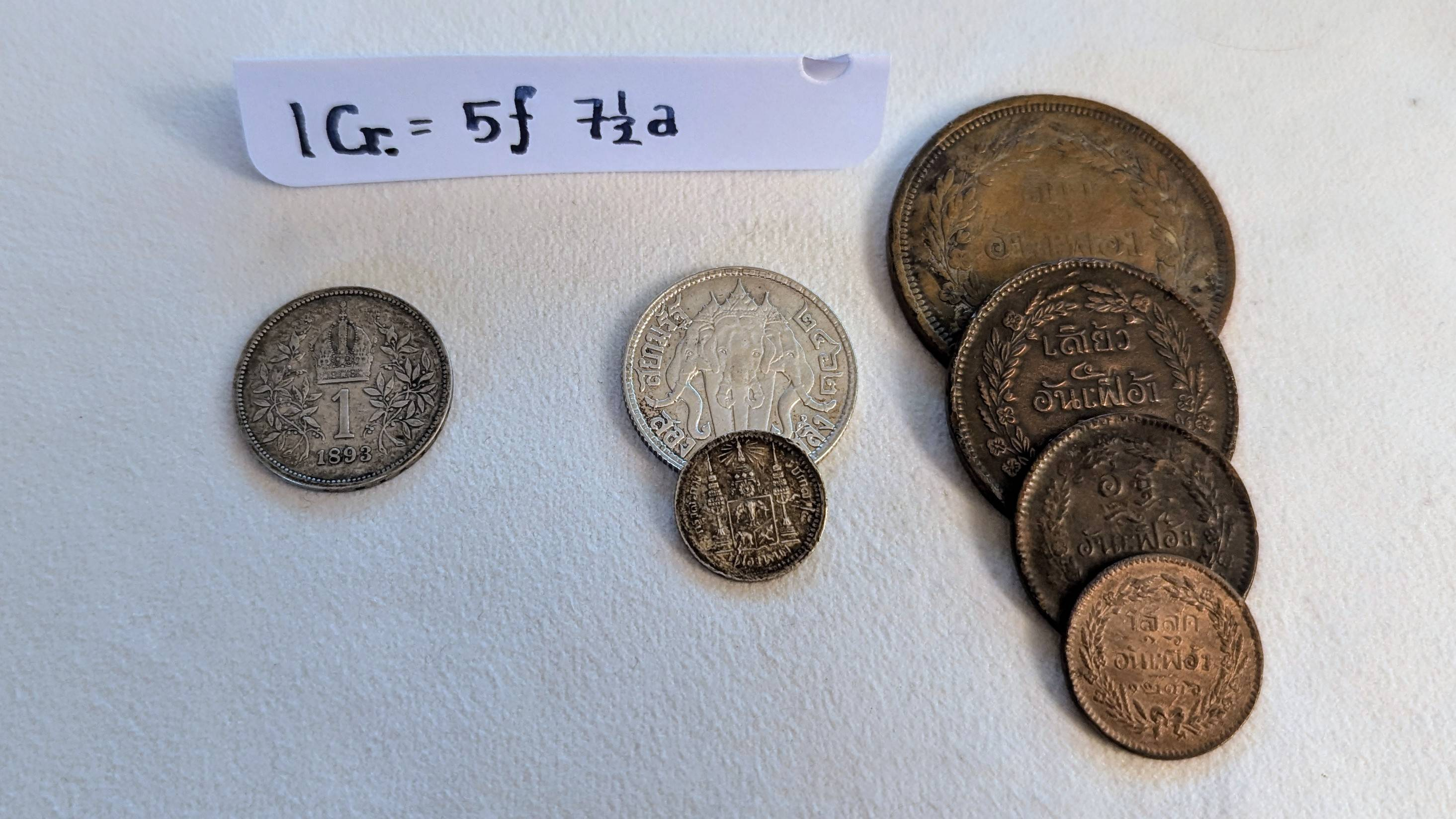
Austro-Hungarian corona to THB (K.1=฿0/5/7½)

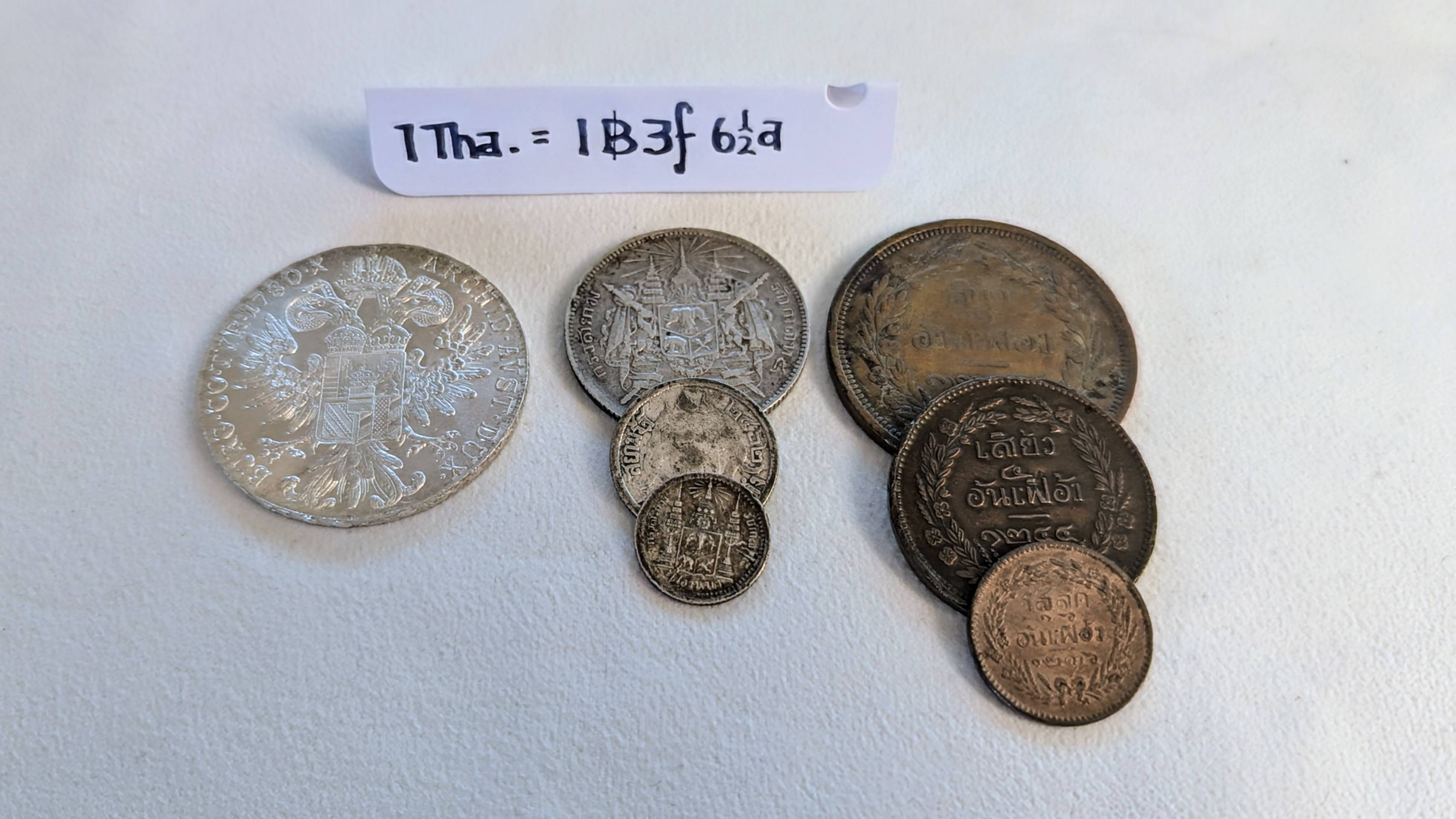
Austria Thaler to THB (MTT$1=฿1/3/6½)

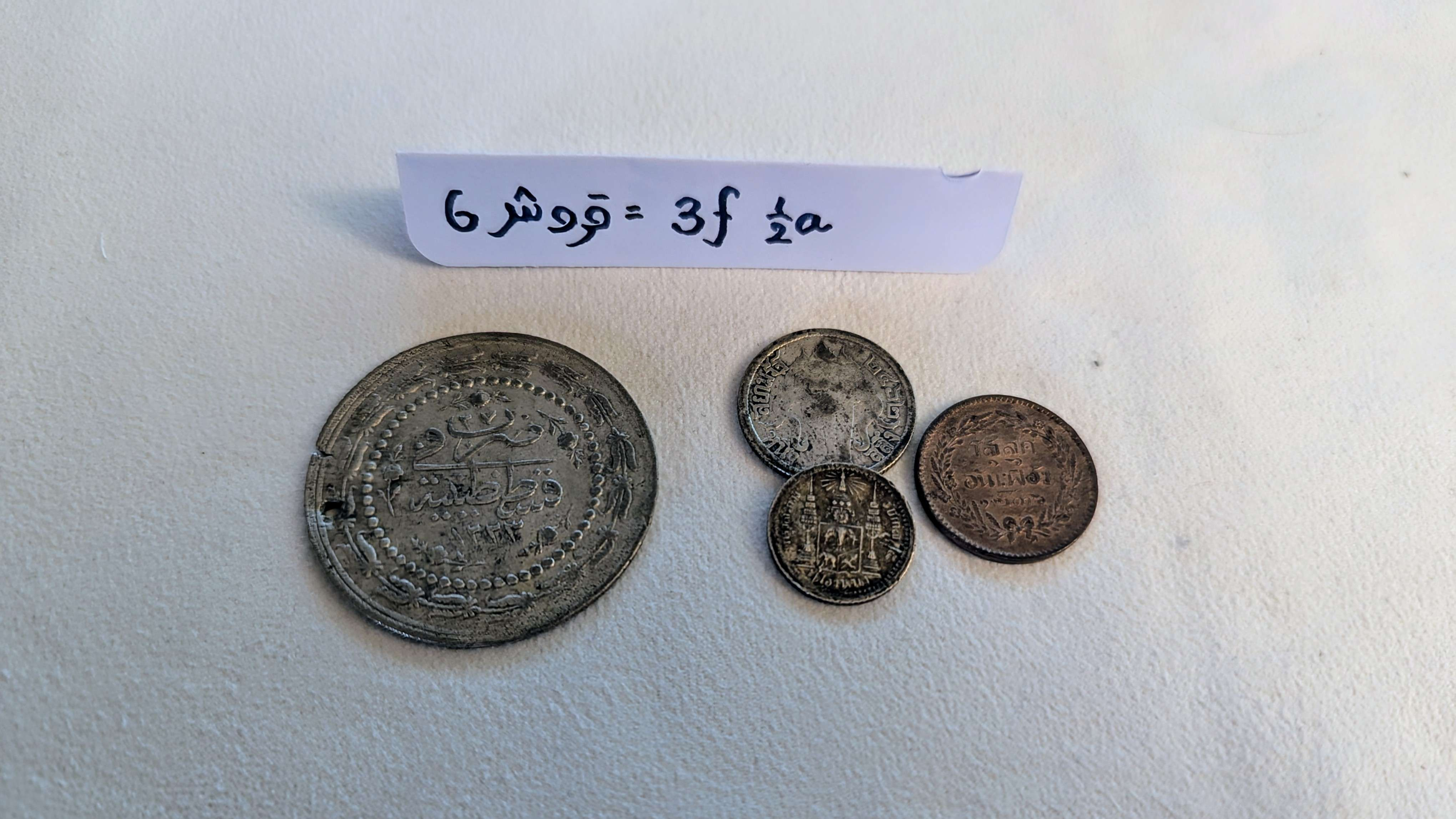
Ottoman Kurush to THB (Kş.6=฿0/3/½)

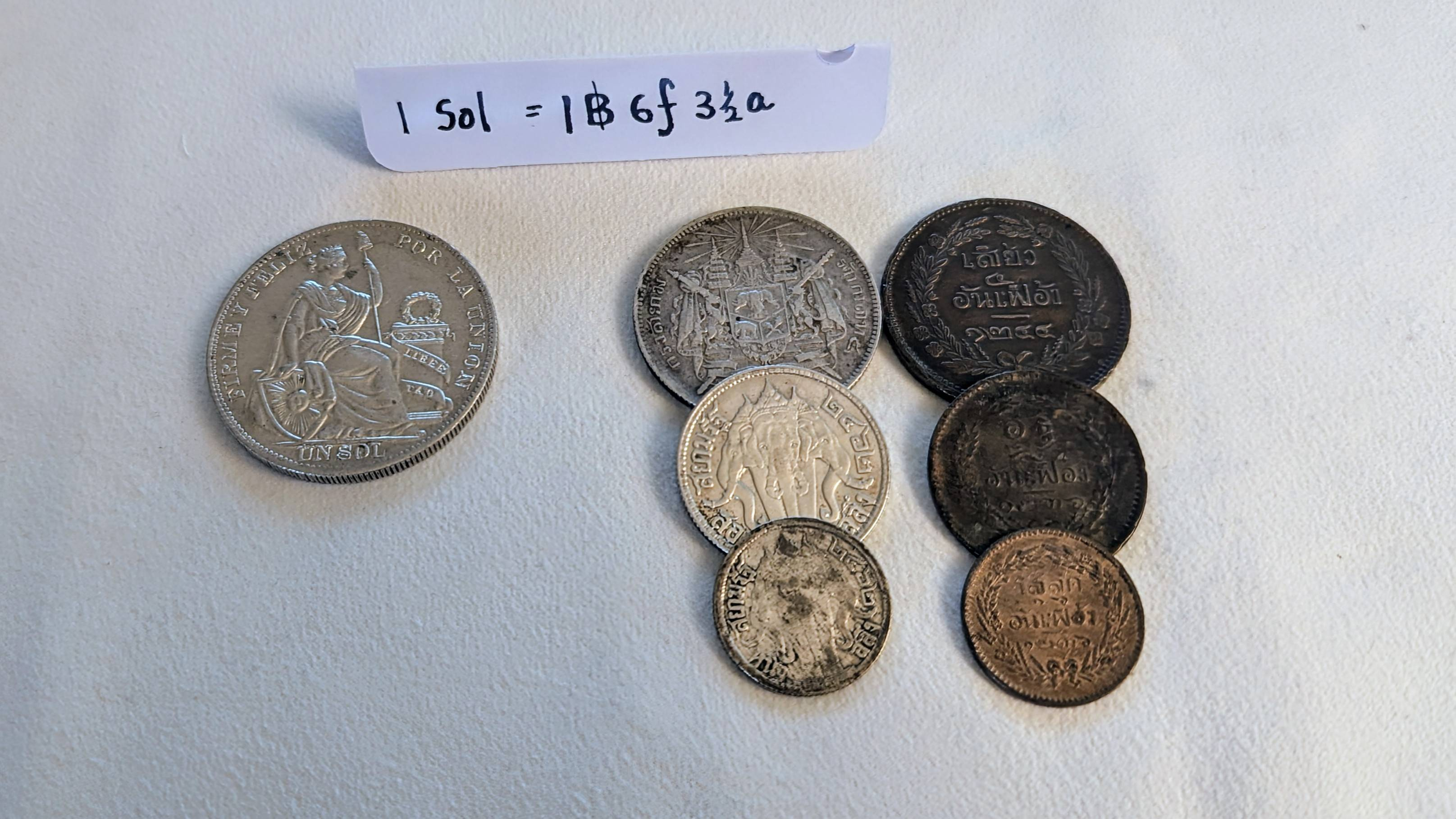
Peruvian sol to THB (S/.2=฿2/6/3½)

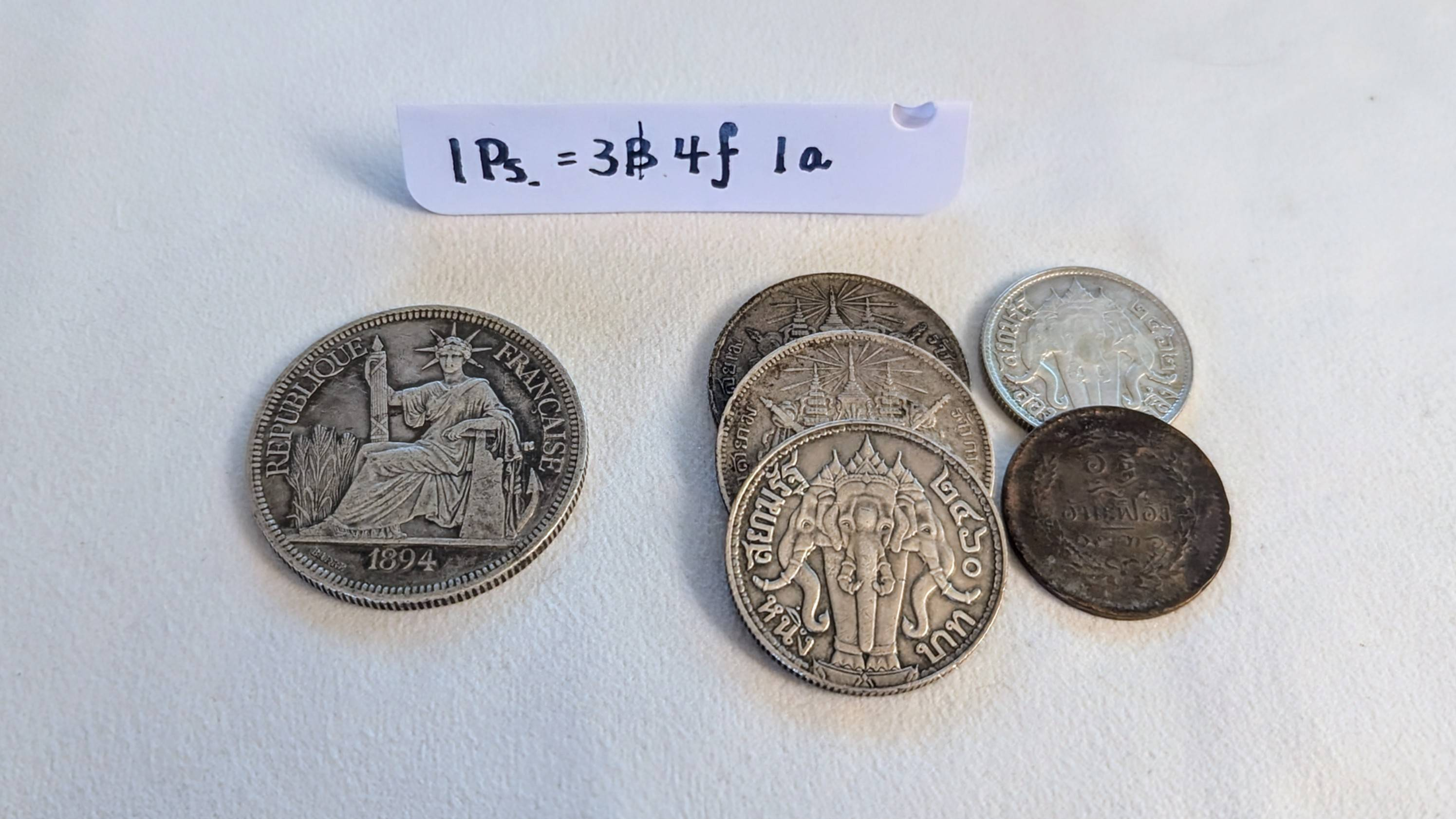
Indochinese Piastre to THB (Ps.1=฿3/4/1)

=== Purchasing power history ===
A table showing the equivalent of 100 baht in purchasing power throughout history (rounded to the lowest denomination of coins)
| 2024 (~1.9%/yr) | 2020 (~0.36%/yr) | 2015 (~2.64%/yr) | 2010 (~3.05%/yr) | 2005 (~1.65/yr) |
|---|---|---|---|---|
| 100.00 baht | 92.40 baht | 90.75 baht | 78.75 baht | 66.75 baht |
| 2000 (~4.65%/yr) | 1995 (~4.36%/yr) | 1990 (~2.45%/yr) | 1985 (~7.75/yr) | 1980 (~6.08%/yr) |
| 61.25 baht | 47.00 baht | 36.75 baht | 32.25 baht | 19.75 baht |
| 1975 (~7.85%/yr) | 1970 (~2.4%/yr) | 1965 (~1.93%/yr) | 1960 (~10.81%/yr) | 1955 (~9.57%/yr) |
| 13.75 baht | 8.35 baht | 7.35 baht | 6.64 baht | 3.05 baht |
| 1950 (~18.62%/yr) | 1945 (~5.45%/yr) | 1940 (~3.75%/yr) | 1935 (~4.62%/yr) | 1930 (~6.00%/yr) |
| 1.59 baht | 11.0 satang | 8.0 satang | 6.5 satang | 5.0 satang |
| 1925 (~1.10%/yr) | | 1892 | | |
| 3.5 satang | | 1 Att + 1 Solot | | |

== See also ==
- Economy of Thailand
- Stock Exchange of Thailand

| Preceded by: Srivijaya Masa; Location: Srivijaya; Ratio: 1 silver baht = 6.31 masa | Currency of Thailand; 1238 – incumbent | Succeeded by: currently in use |
| Preceded by: Lavo shell currency Location: Lavo Kingdom; Ratio: 1 silver baht = 168 shells | Currency of Thailand; 1238 – incumbent | Succeeded by: currently in use |
| Preceded by: Khmer empire currency Location: Khmer Empire | Currency of Thailand; 1238 – incumbent | Succeeded by: currently in use |
