= Half-satang coin =

Denomination of the Thai baht

1/2 satang
- Thailand
- Value: 1/200 Thai baht
- Mass: 1.8 g
- Diameter: 19 mm
- Edge: Smooth
- Composition: bronze
- Years of minting: 1937

Obverse
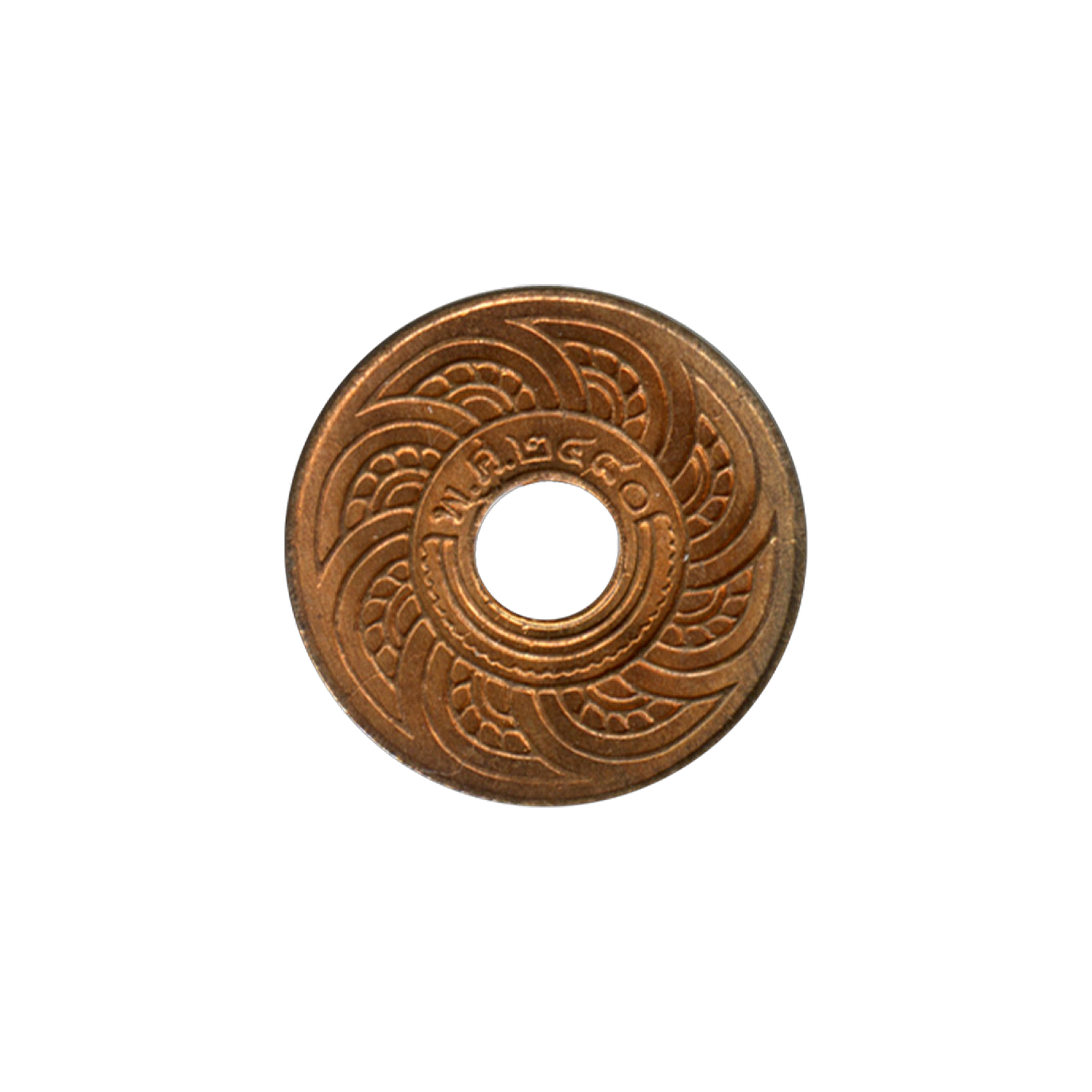
- Design date: 1837

Reverse
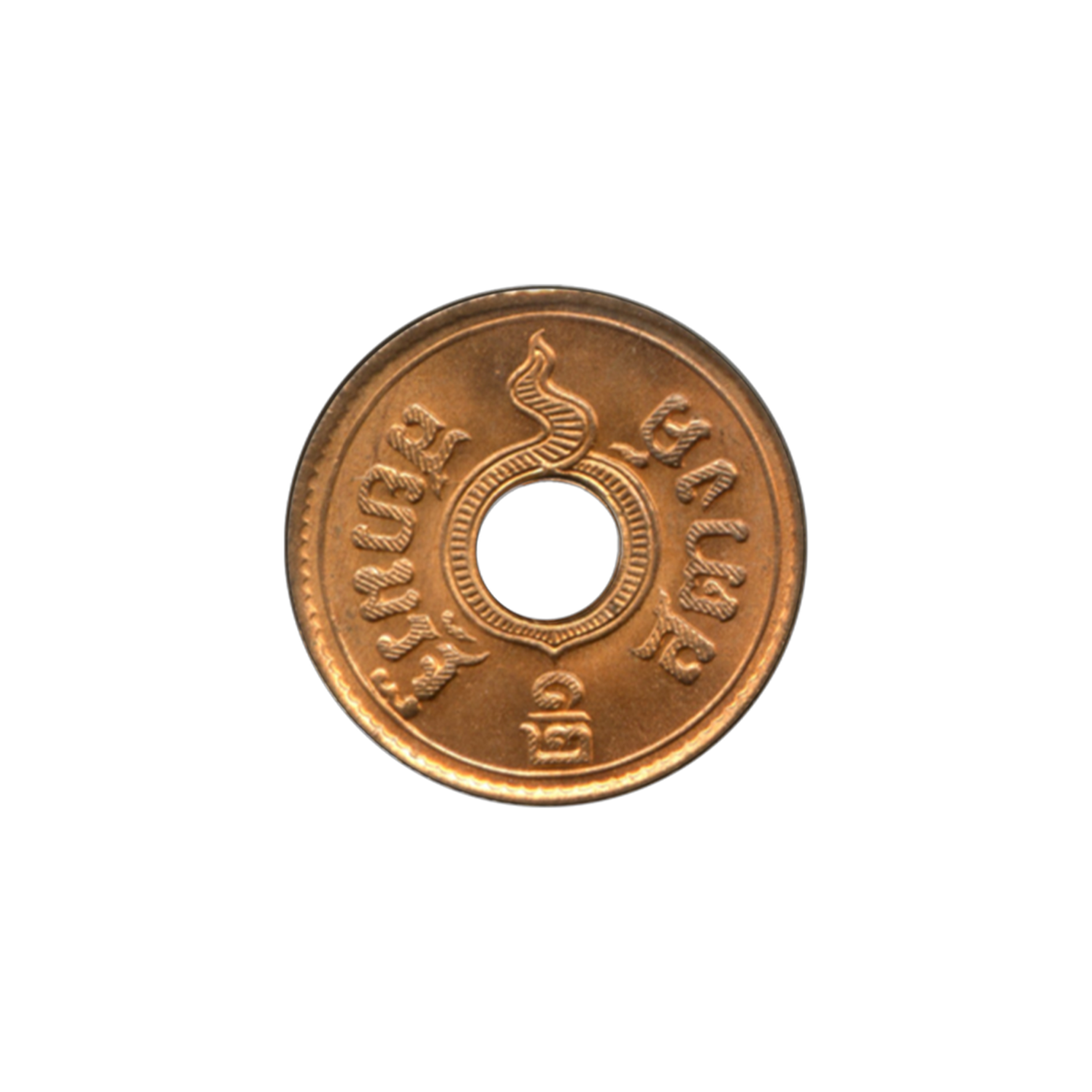
- Design date: 1937

The Thailand half-satang coin (0.5 st. or 0.5 สต.) is a unit of currency equivalent to 1/200 of a baht of a Thai baht. It was introduced in 1937 as a bronze coin with a hole through its middle and was produced only in that year.

== See also ==
- Thai baht
- Siao coin
- Sik coin
- Fuang coin
