= Two-and-a-half-satang coin =

Denomination of the Thai baht

2 1/2 satang
- Thailand
- Value: 1/40 Thai baht
- Mass: 1.8 g
- Diameter: 16 mm
- Edge: Smooth
- Composition: nickel
- Years of minting: 1897

Obverse
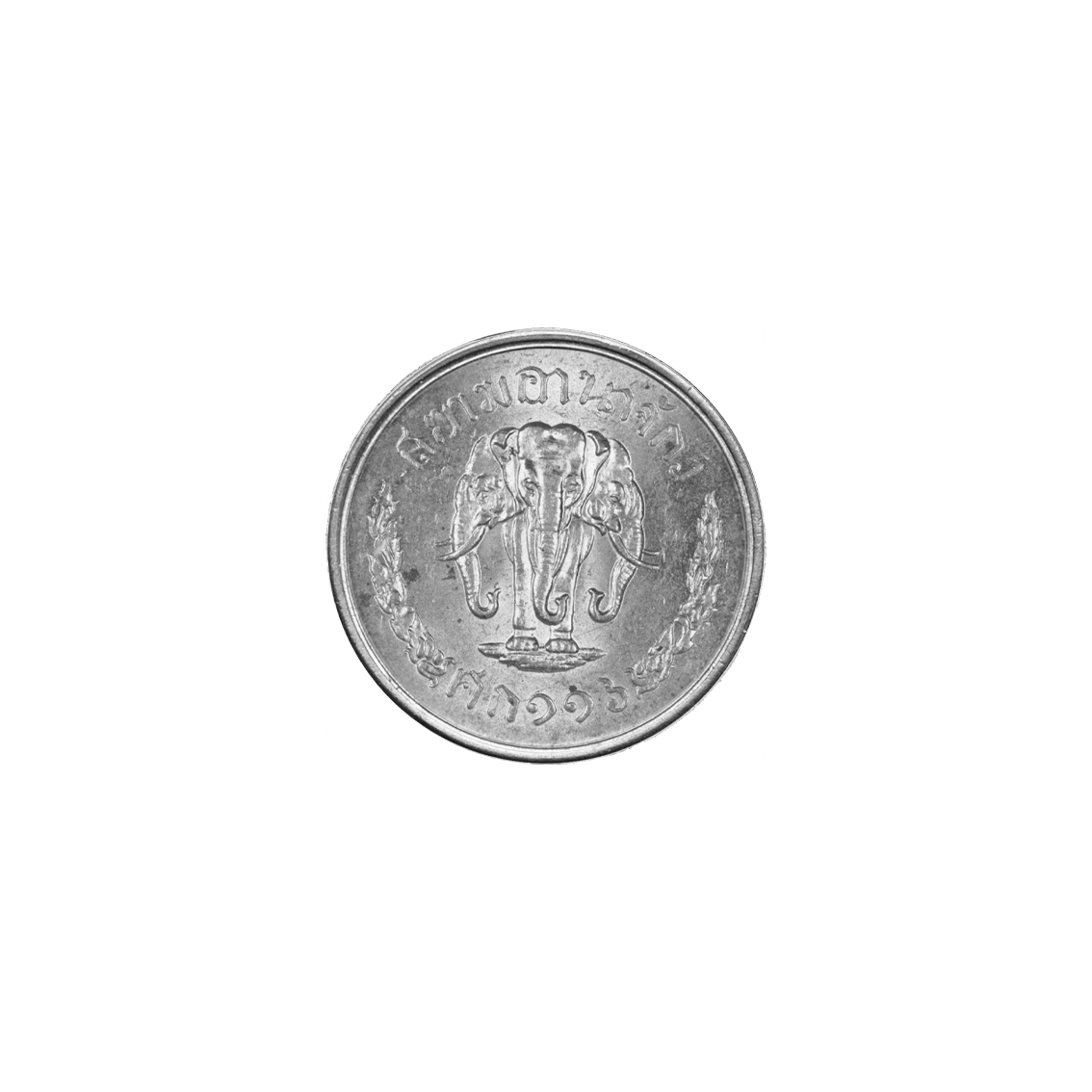
- Design date: 1897

Reverse
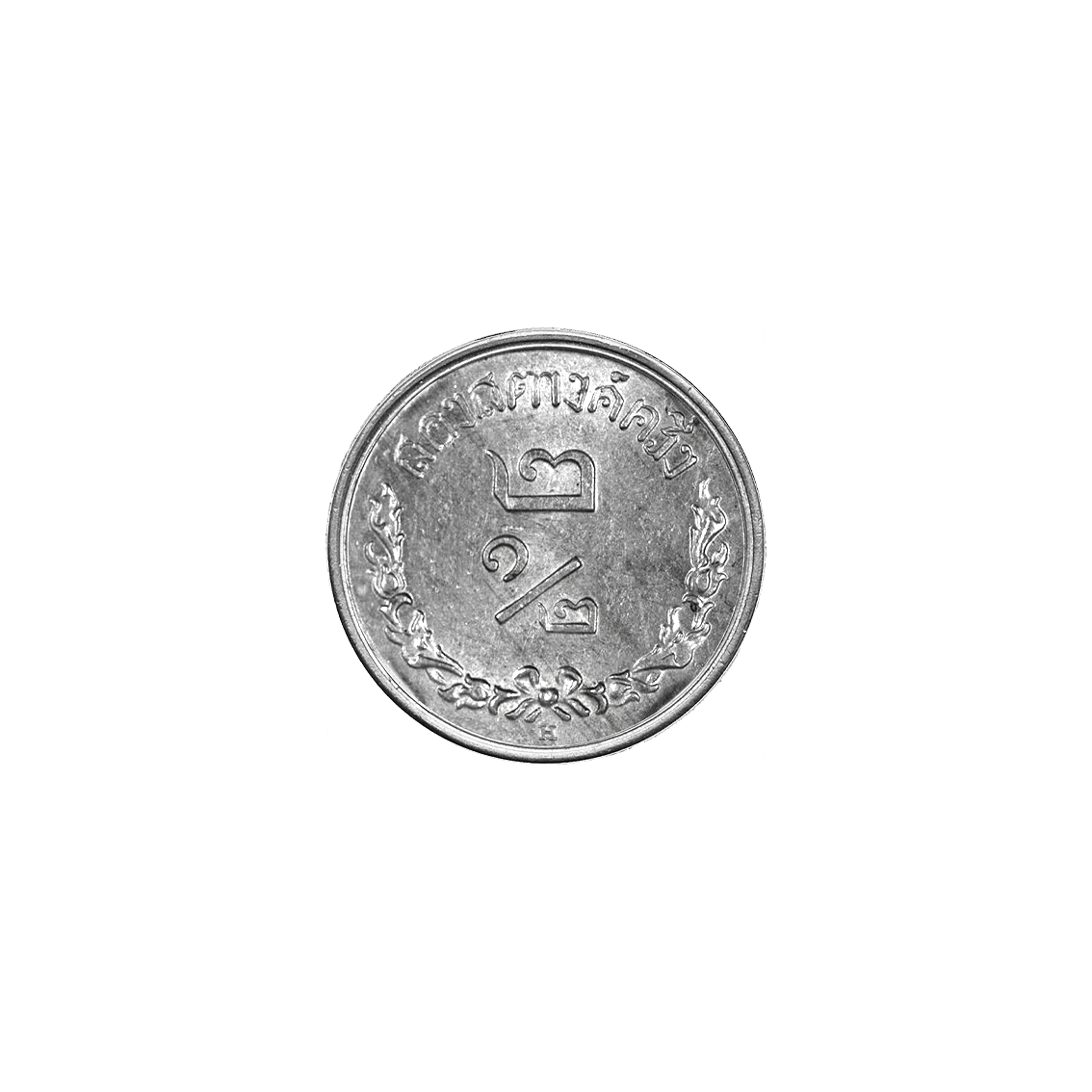
- Design date: 1897

The Thailand two-and-a-half-satang coin ( 2.5 st. or 2.5 สต.) was a unit of currency equivalent to 1/40 of a baht of a Thai baht. It was introduced in 1897 during the early decimalization of Siamese currency and was minted for a limited period before the denomination was discontinued.

== See also ==
- Thai baht
- Siao coin
- Sik coin
- Fuang coin
