= Twenty-satang coin =

Denomination of the Thai baht

20 satang
- Thailand
- Value: 1/5 Thai baht
- Mass: (1897) 6.57 g (1942) 3 g (1945) 6 g
- Diameter: (1897) 25.0 g (1942) 22 g (1945) 22 mm
- Edge: Smooth
- Composition: (1897) nickel (1942) silver 0.650 (1945) tin
- Years of minting: 1897-1945

Obverse
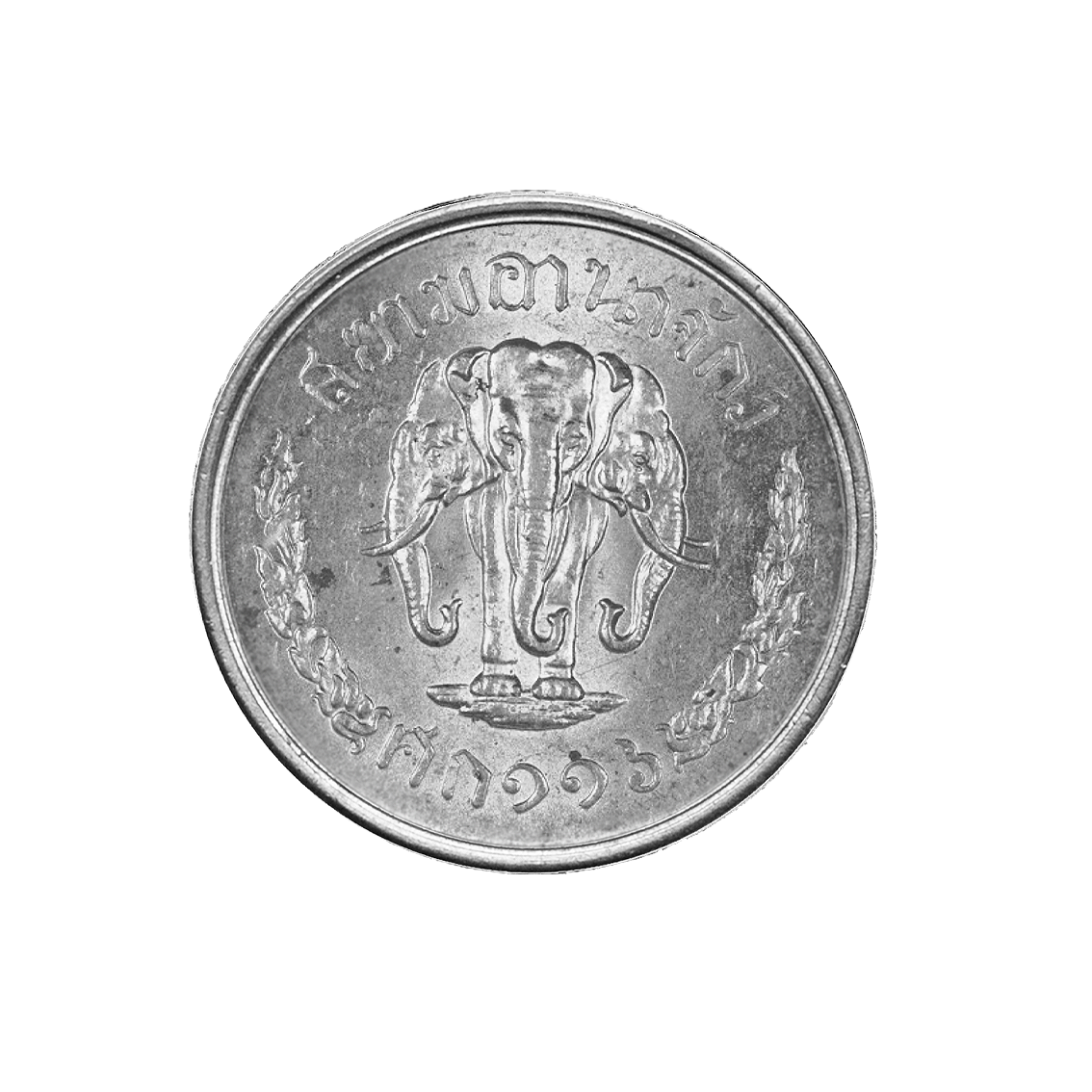
- Design date: 1897

Reverse
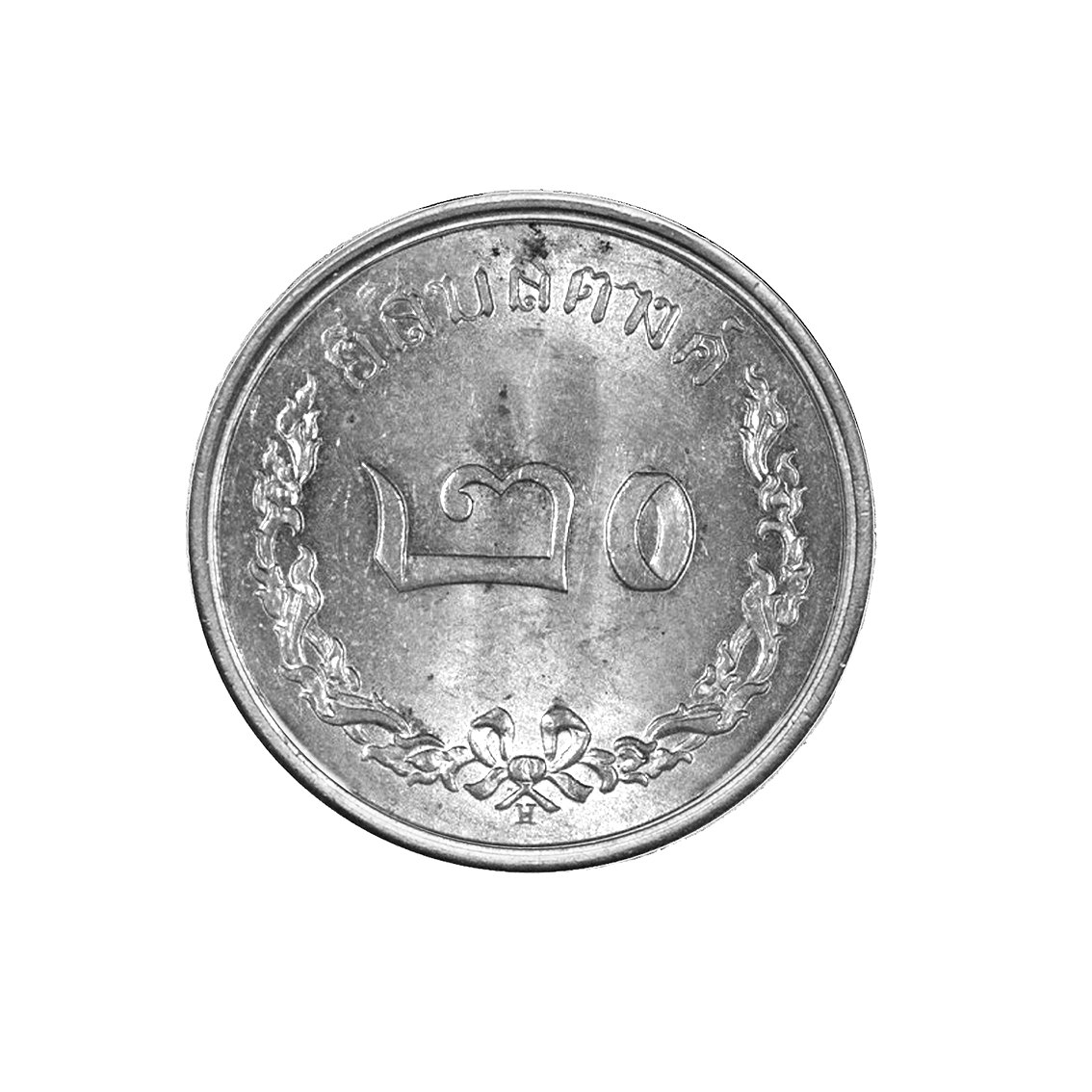
- Design date: 1897

The Thailand twenty-satang coin (20 st. or 20 สต.) is a unit of currency equivalent to 1/5 of a baht. First issued in 1897 during the early modernization of Thai coinage, the 20 satang coin has appeared in several compositions and designs over time and is now never used in everyday circulation. The issues after 1897 are holed and was briefly made of silver in 1942. The coin was demonetized in 1908, and is no longer legal-tender.

Evolution of 20 satang

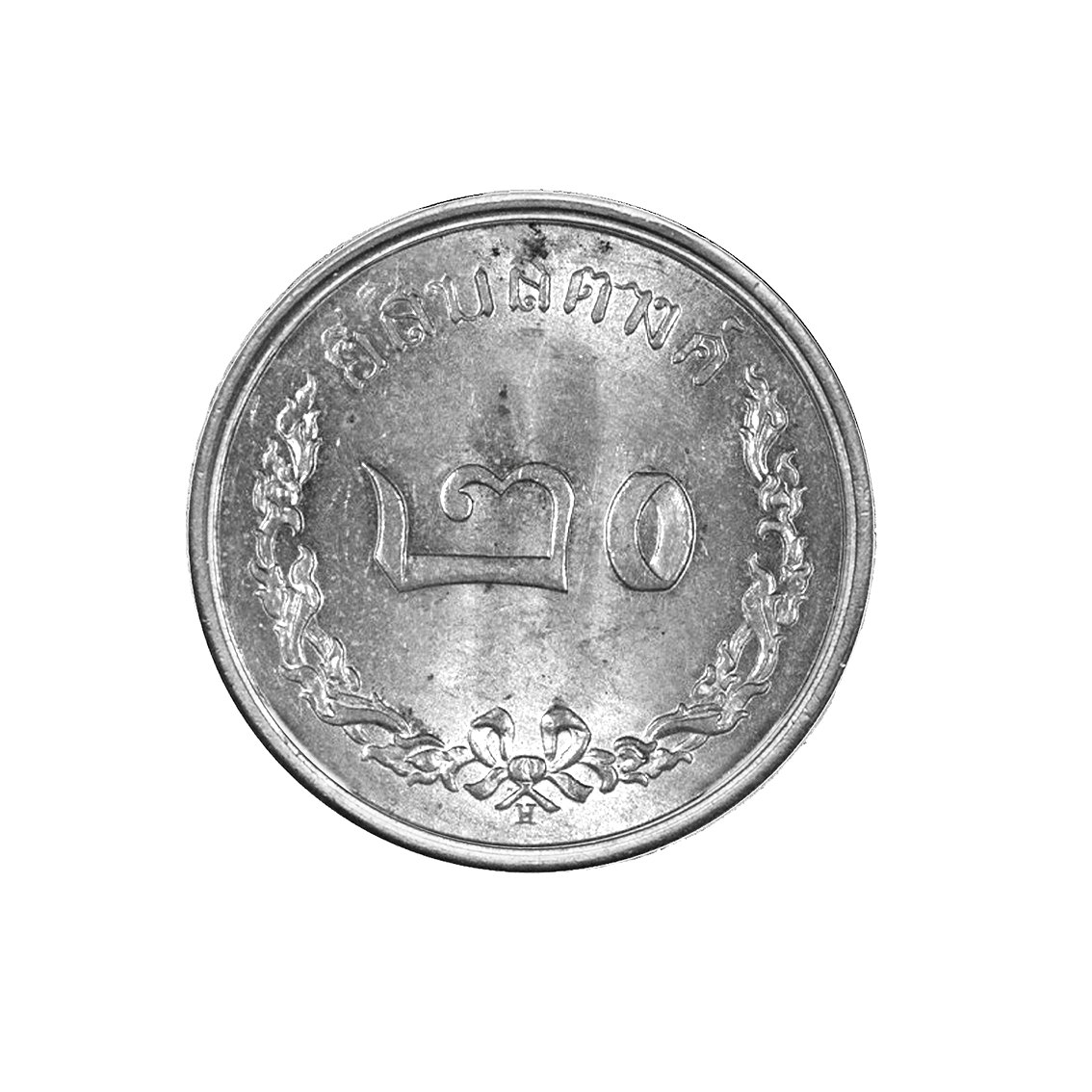
1897

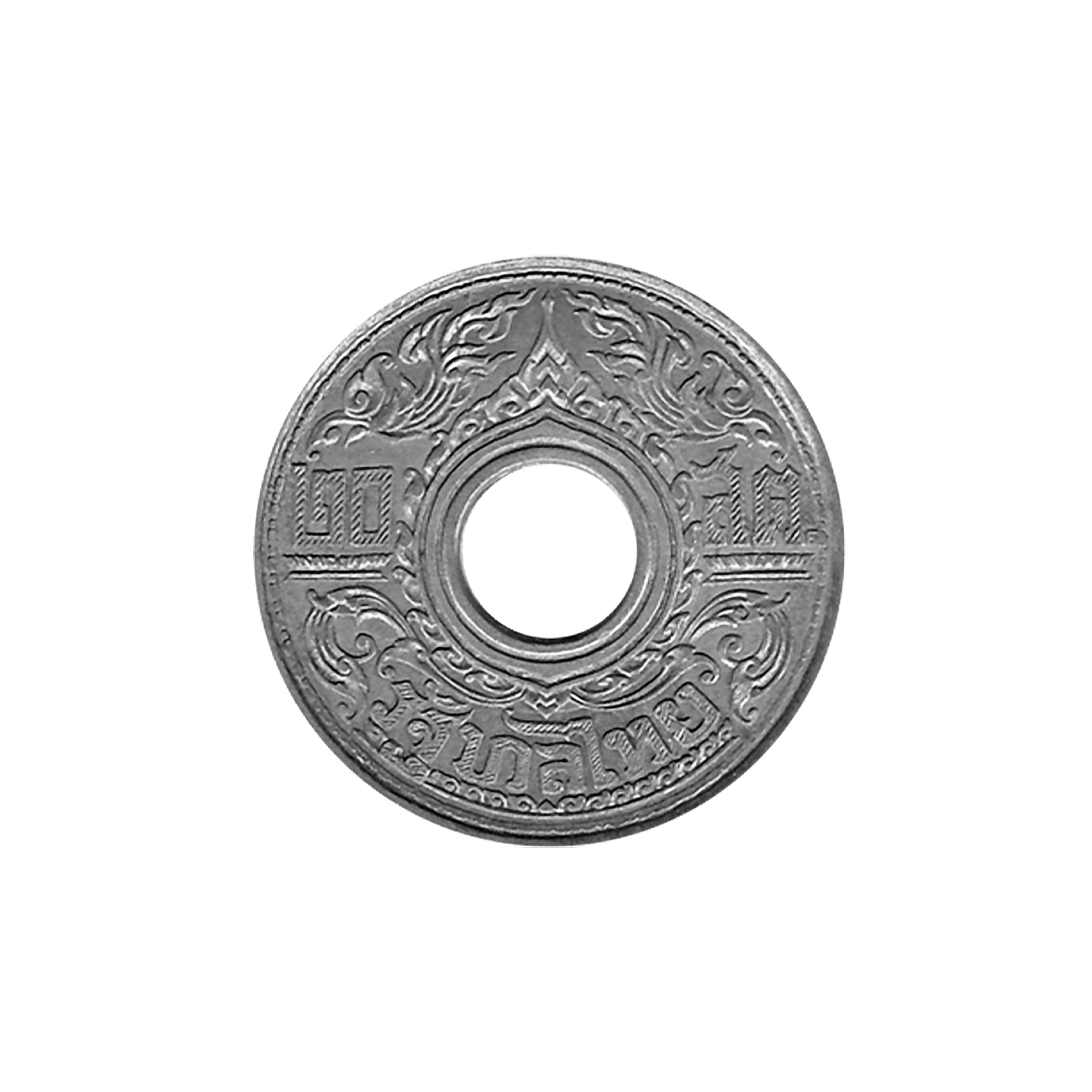
1942

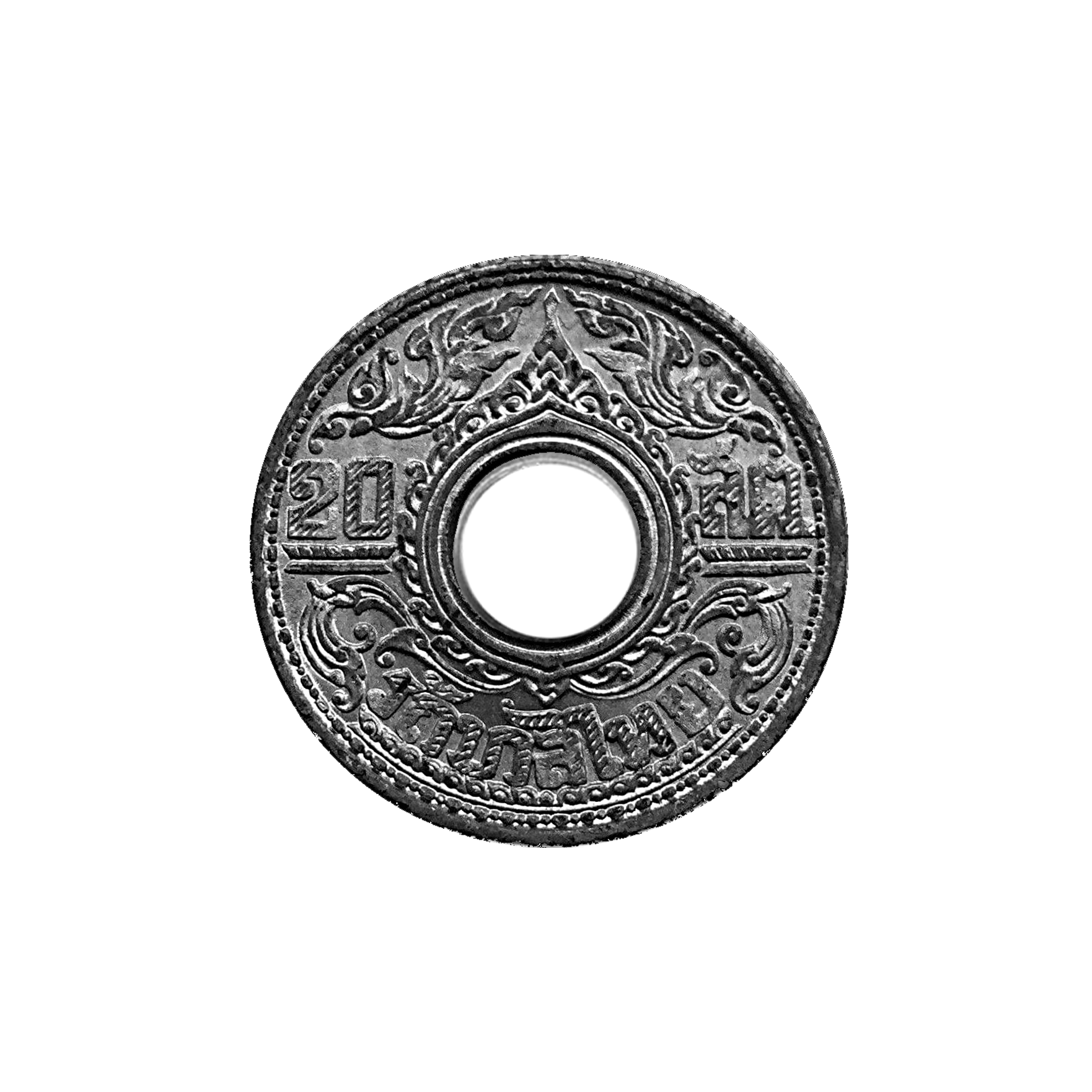
1945

== See also ==
- Thai baht
- Siao coin
- Sik coin
- Fuang coin
