= One-solot coin =

Denomination of the Thai baht

1 solot
- Thailand
- Value: 1/128 Thai baht
- Mass: (1860-1869) 4.00 g (1869-1874) 7.00 g (1874-1888) 2.67 g (1888-1905) 2.80 g
- Diameter: (1860-1869) 23 mm (1869-1874) 32 mm (1874-1888) 20 mm (1888-1905) 19 mm
- Edge: Reeded
- Composition: (1860-1874) tin-copper alloy (1874-1905) copper
- Years of minting: 1860-1905

Obverse
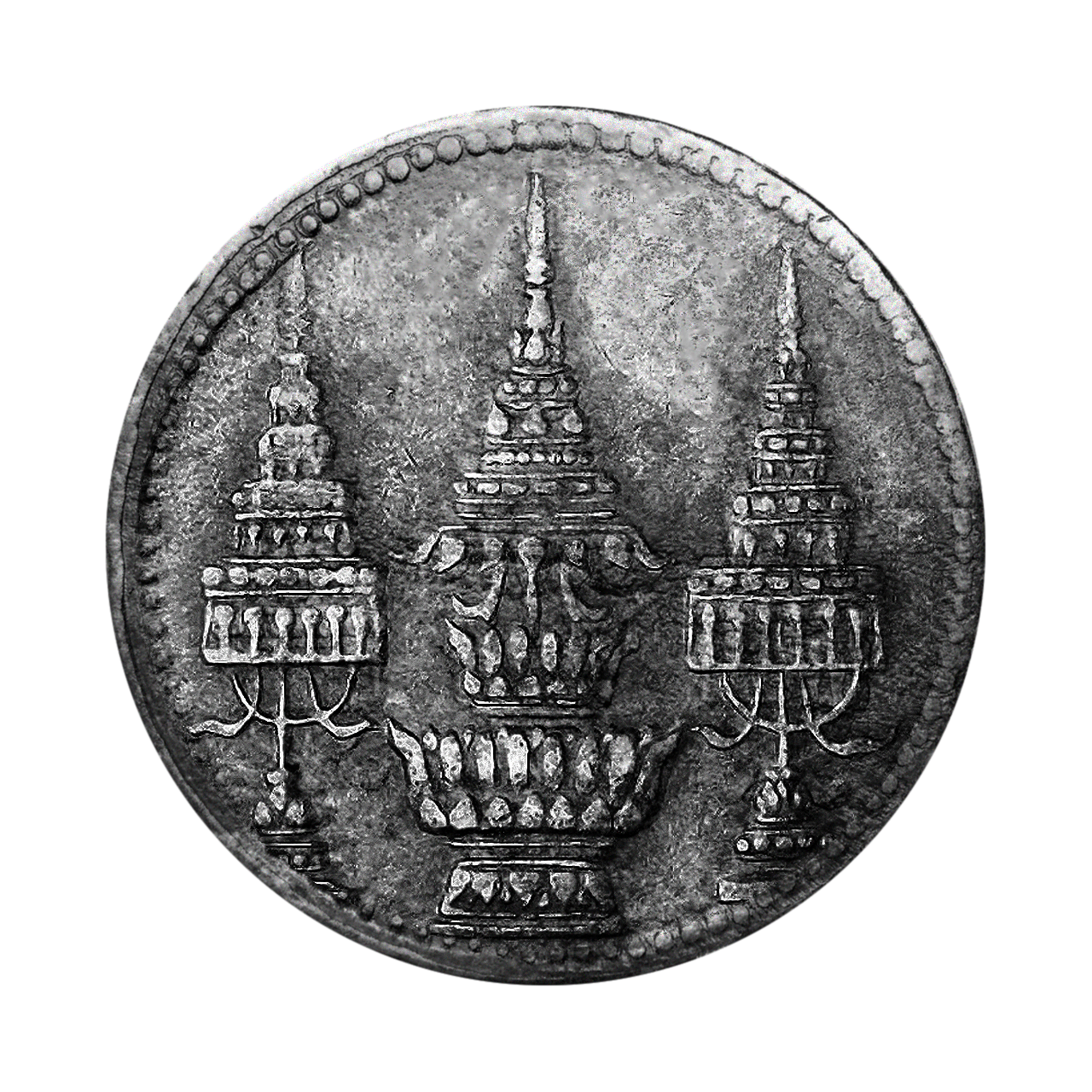
- Design date: 1869

Reverse
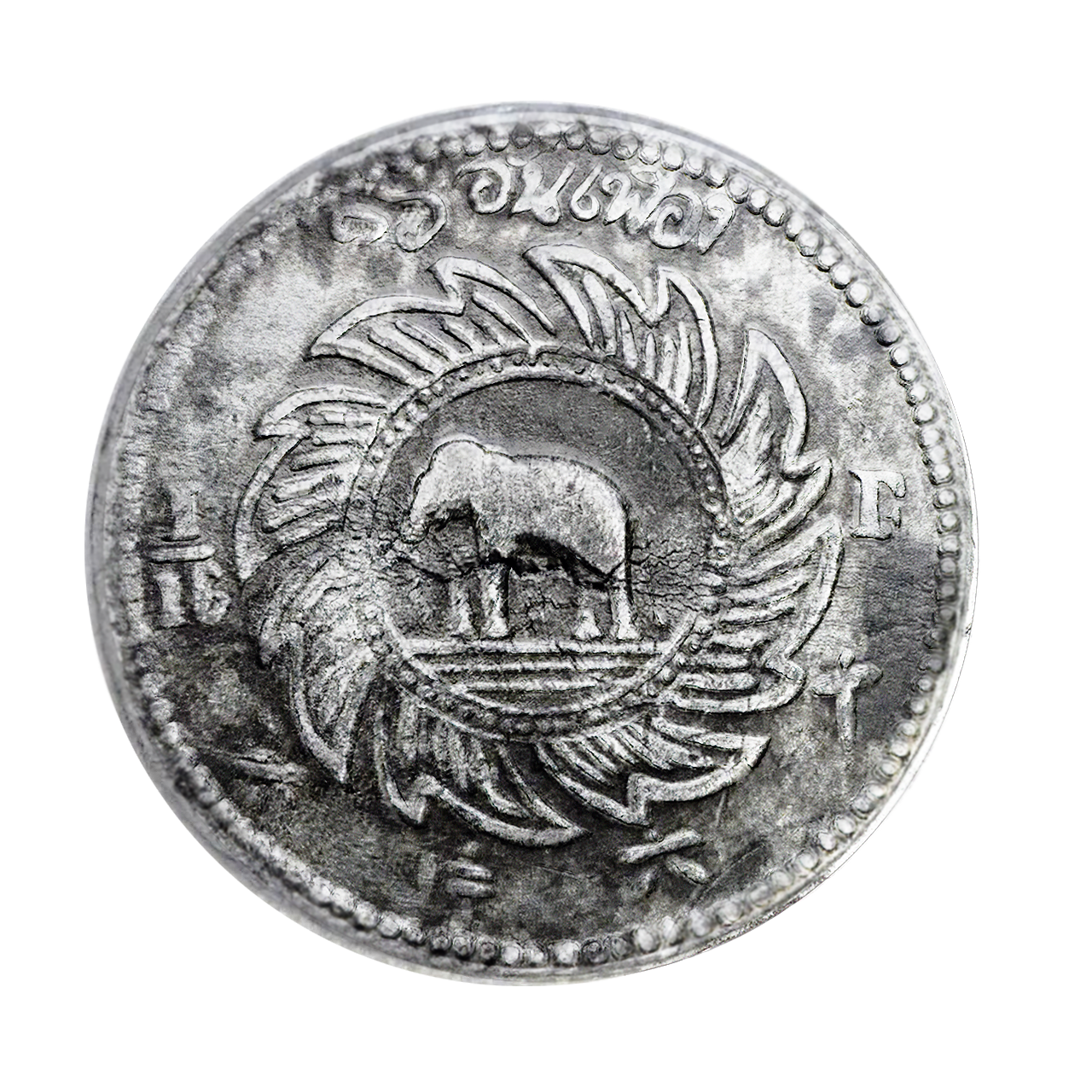
- Design date: 1869

The solot (Thai: โสฬส) piece, or the half at coin was a historic Thai currency unit used during the pre-decimal era of the Thai baht. One solot was equal to 1/128 of a baht, making it one of the smallest denominations in the traditional Thai monetary system.

Evolution of solot

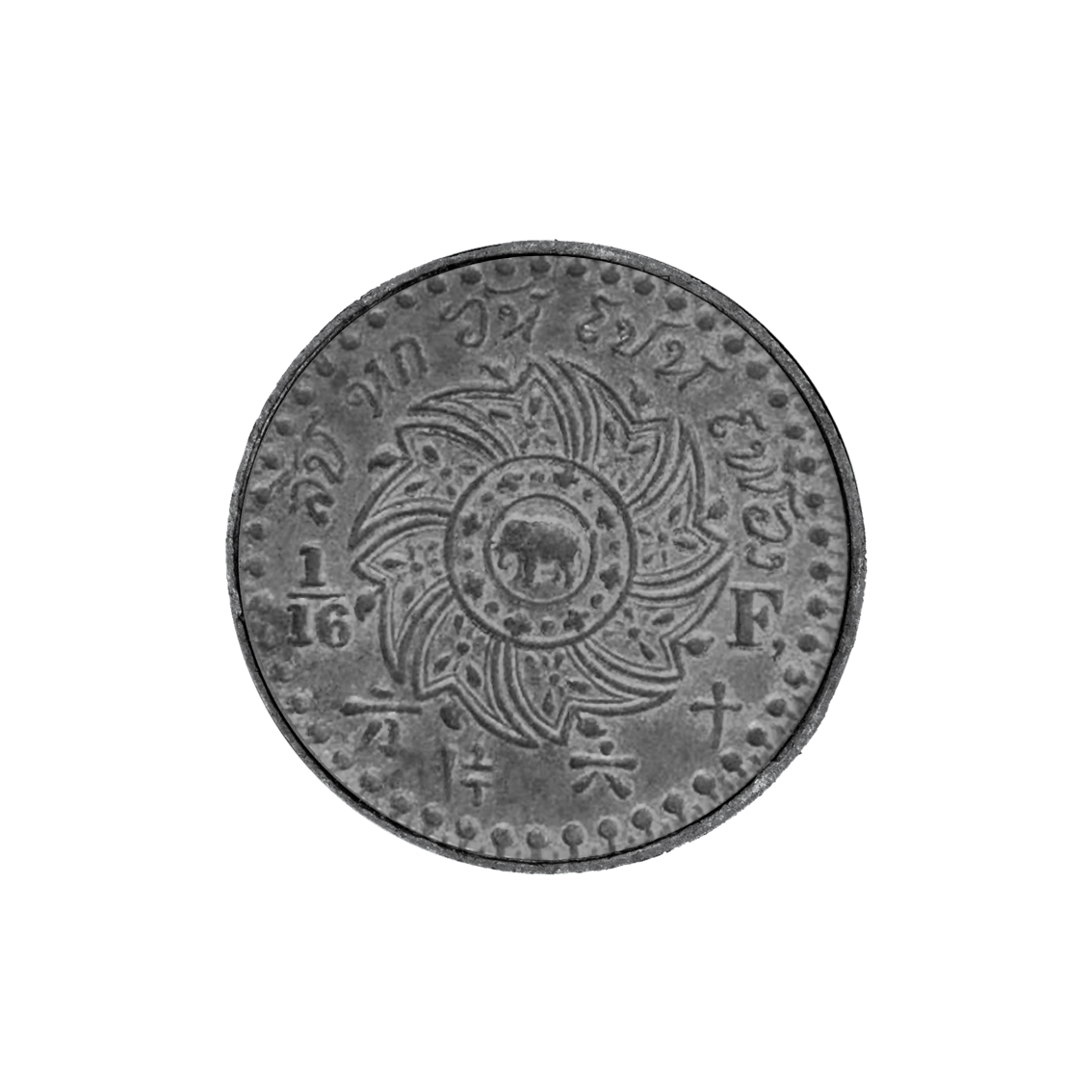
1862

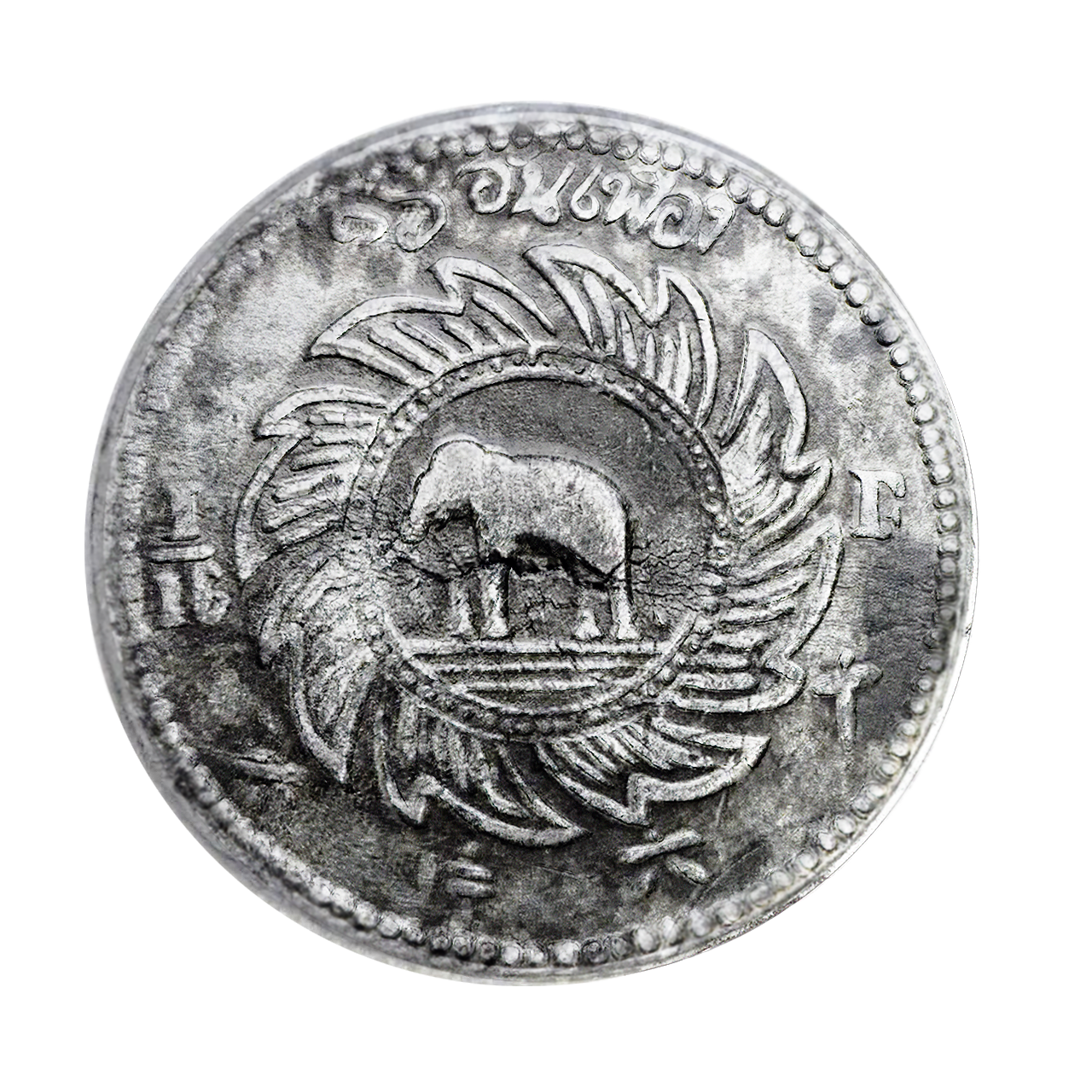
1869

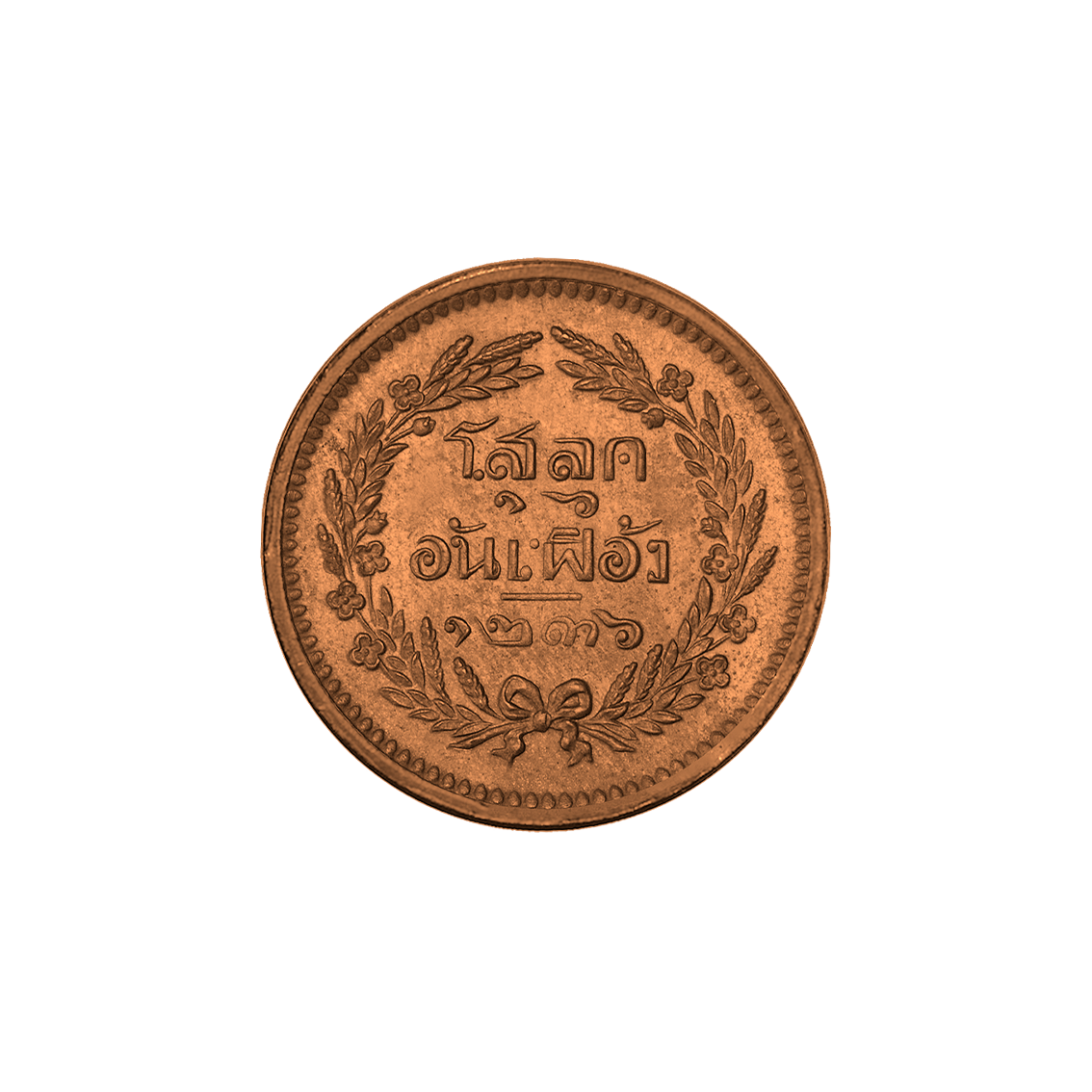
1876

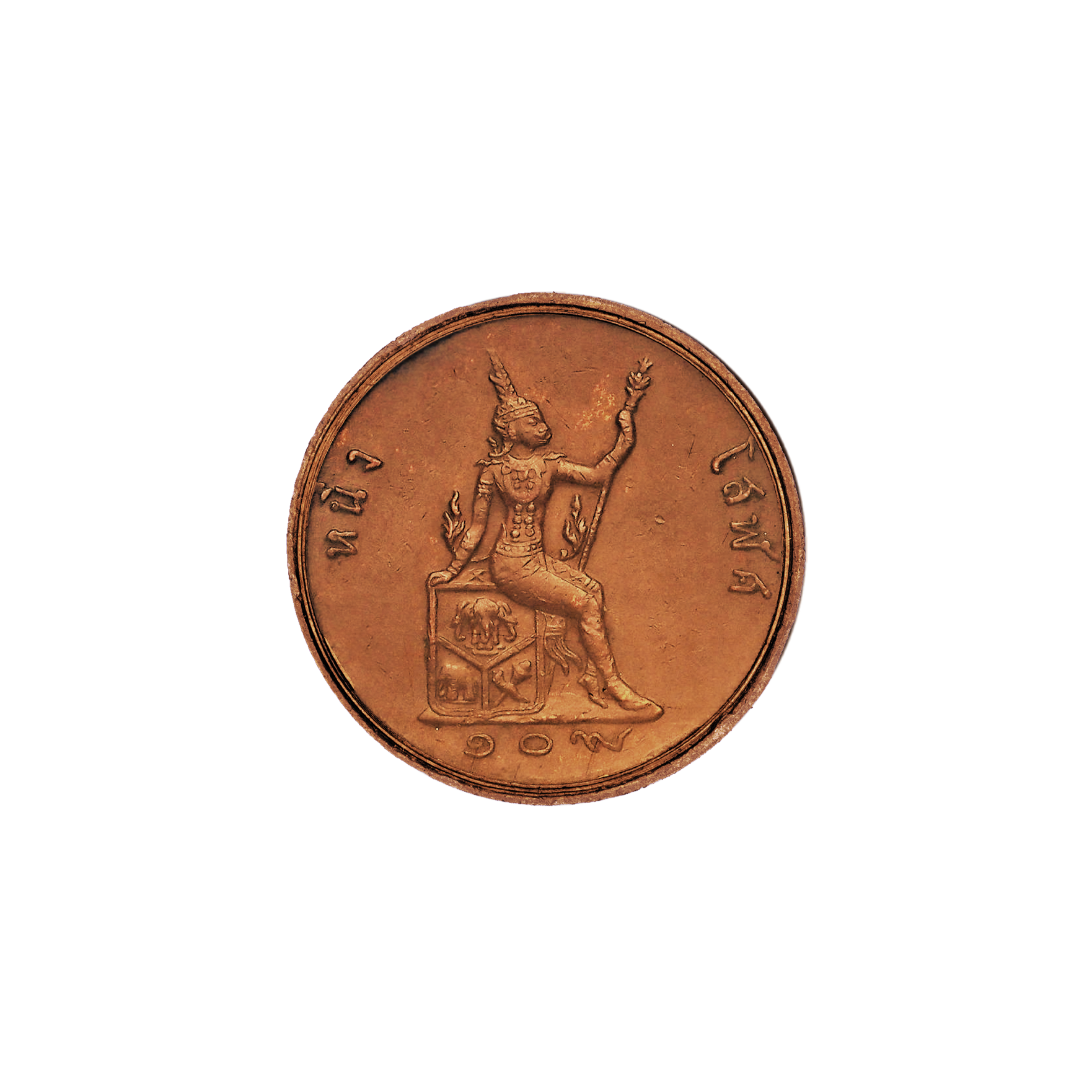
1888

== Etymology ==
The term solot is a linguistic loanword derived from the Pali soḷasa, meaning "sixteen." This etymology directly corresponds to its fixed exchange rate within the traditional weight-based Siamese currency hierarchy, where exactly sixteen solot pieces were legally equivalent to one silver fueang (เฟื้อง).

== History ==
Prior to the mid-19th century, transactions requiring values lower than an at were settled using natural commodity currencies, primarily imported cowrie shells (bia), or highly localized, hand-poured lead tokens. Following the signing of the Bowring Treaty in 1855 and the subsequent rapid integration of Siam into international trade networks, the manual production of traditional bullet money (pod duang) proved incapable of meeting commercial volume requirements.

To standardize the domestic money supply, Royal minting initiatives were established to transition to flat, machine-struck coinage:

- Tin-Copper Issues (Reign of Rama IV): Between 1860 and 1862, King Mongkut authorized the domestic striking of flat solot coins composed of a soft tin-copper alloy. While utilizing abundant domestic tin reserves, the alloy proved highly susceptible to environmental degradation and rapid physical wear.
- Copper Issues (Reign of Rama V): Recognizing the structural deficiencies of the domestic tin issues, King Chulalongkorn overhauled the national currency production. The Siamese government outsourced industrial minting operations to prominent European facilities, notably the Heaton Mint in Birmingham, England, and the Hamburg Mint in Germany.

== Designs ==
=== The Chulalongkorn Monogram Series (1875–1883) ===
Produced at the Heaton Mint, these copper specimens feature a distinct lack of royal portraiture, relying instead on heraldic symbols:

- Obverse: Features the royal cipher of King Rama V—the stylized Thai initials จปร (Chulalongkorn Paramin R), surmounted by the Great Crown of Victory and flanked by the textual inscription “Krung Siam, Ratchakan thi 5” (Kingdom of Siam, 5th Reign).
- Reverse: Bears the explicit denomination text โสลด ๑๖ อันเฟื้อง (Solot, 16 pieces [equal] a Fueang), framed symmetrically by a botanical wreath of Cassia javanica (Java Cassia foliage).
- Chronology: Date attribution on these issues utilizes the Chula Sakarat (CS) civil calendar system, with prominent mintages bearing the dates ๑๒๓๖ (CS 1236 / 1875 CE) and ๑๒๔๔ (CS 1244 / 1882 CE).

=== The Phra Siam Devadhiraj Series (1887–1905) ===
This subsequent design phase marked a significant shift toward Western coinage styles, featuring a left-facing bust profile of King Chulalongkorn in military uniform on the obverse. The reverse portrays Phra Siam Devadhiraj—the guardian deity of the nation—seated on a stylized throne and holding a trident, positioned above a shield incorporating the tripartite Siamese Royal Coat of Arms.

== Demonetization ==
The structural complexity of the non-decimal system presented chronic administrative challenges for modern accounting, public finance, and international foreign exchange. In 1897, the Siamese government initiated structural currency reform, establishing a strict decimal framework that divided one Baht into 100 Satang.

Following a multi-year transitional period to allow for the retrieval and accounting of legacy issues, the traditional fractional denominations, including the solot, were formally stripped of legal tender status on May 17, 1909.

== See also ==
- Thai baht
- Siao coin
- Sik coin
- Fuang coin
