= One-sik coin =

Denomination of the Thai baht

1 sik
- Thailand
- Value: 1/16 Thai baht
- Mass: (1860) 0.92 g (1860-1874) 7.69 g (1874-1888) 23 g
- Diameter: (1860) 13.0 mm (1860-1874) 30mm (1874-1888) 38.5 mm
- Edge: Smooth
- Composition: (1860) silver (1862) brass (1860-1876) copper
- Years of minting: 1860-1876

Obverse
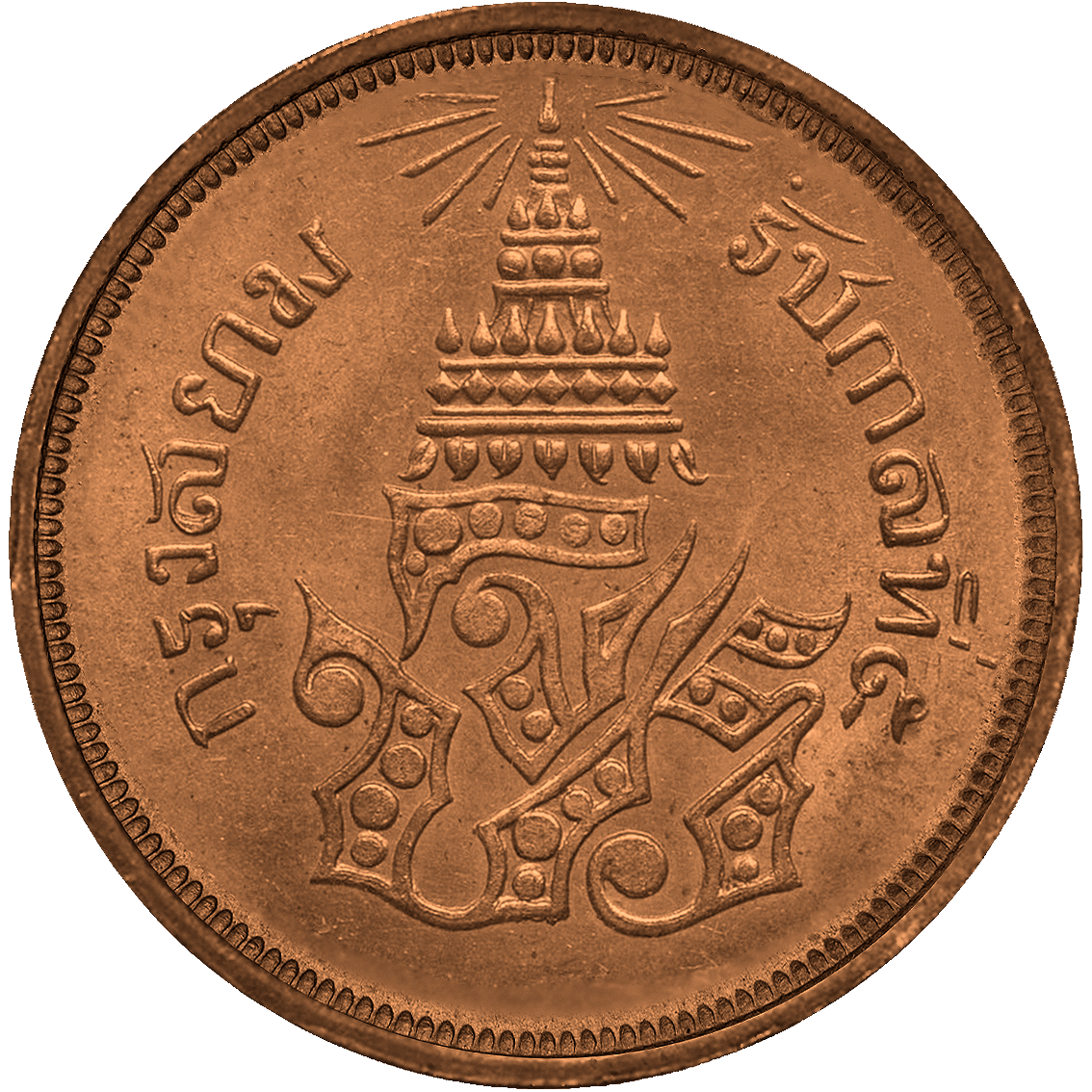
- Design date: 1876

Reverse
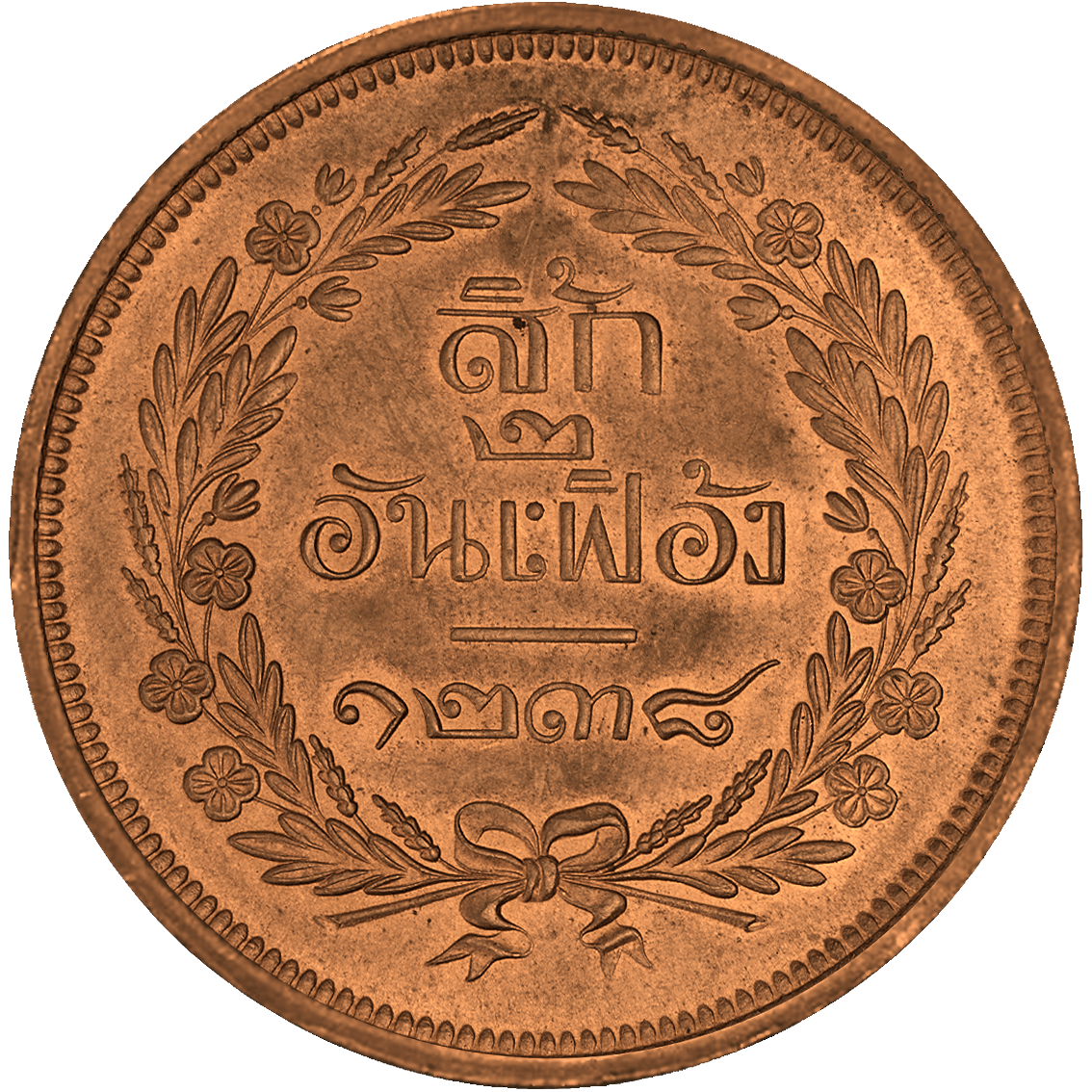
- Design date: 1876

The sik coin (Thai: สิ้ก or ซีก) piece, or the four at coin was a fractional-denomination coin used in the traditional pre-decimal currency system of Siam (modern-day Thailand). The sik represented a value of 1/16 of a baht, equivalent to 1/2 of a fuang or 2 siao /2 pai. Positioned between the fuang and siao denominations, the sik coin formed an important intermediate unit within the non-decimal baht system used before the monetary reforms of the late 19th and early 20th centuries.

Early sik coins were issued in the characteristic podduang (bullet-money) form, cast or hammered into pod-shaped lumps of silver or gold. During later reforms under Kings Rama IV and Rama V, sik coins transitioned into modern flat, struck silver or copper-alloy coins, aligning Siamese currency with international minting standards. The denomination became obsolete following the adoption of the decimal baht–satang system, which replaced all traditional subunits including the sik.

The sik coin of the 1876 series was the largest circulating coin ever produced

Evolution of sik

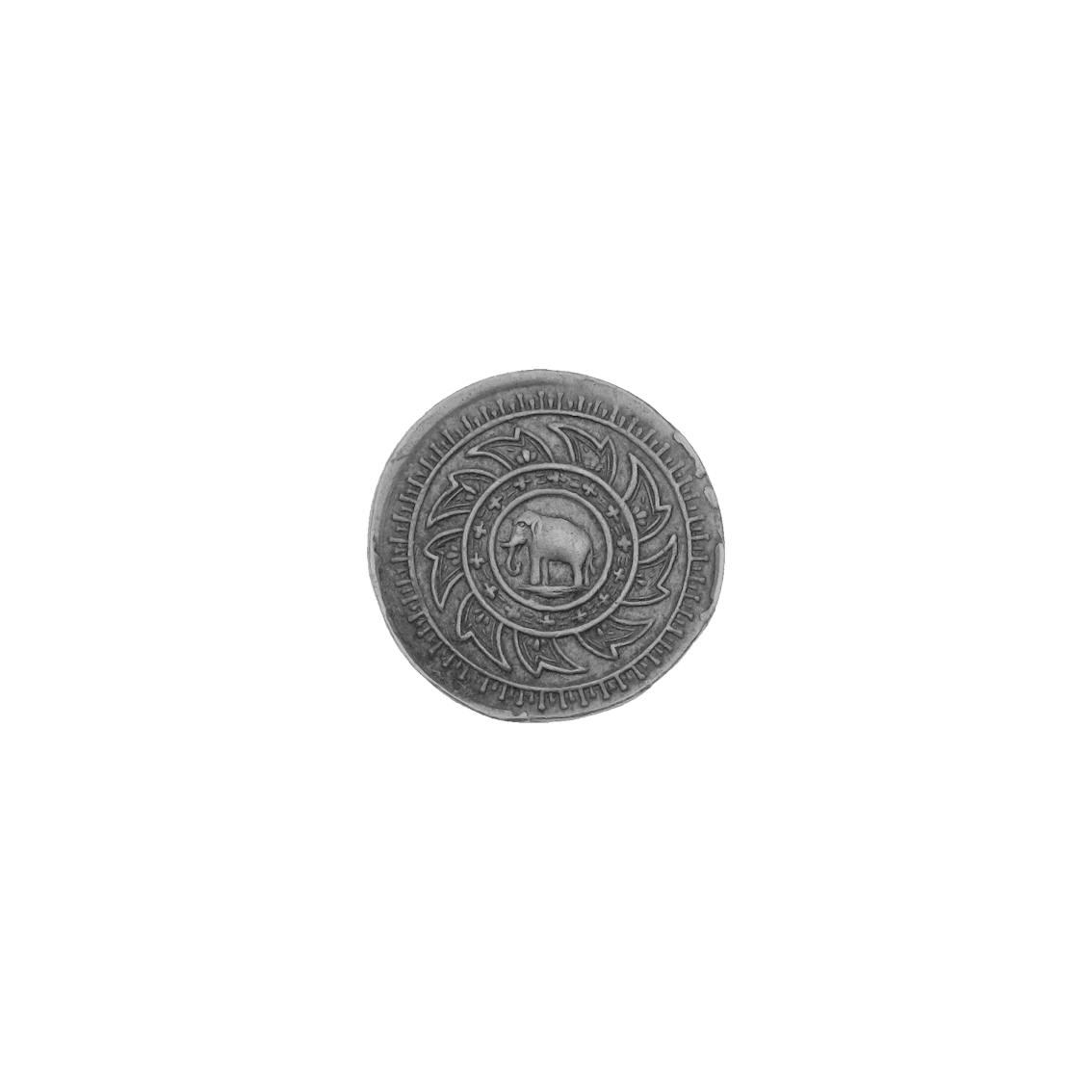
1862-silver

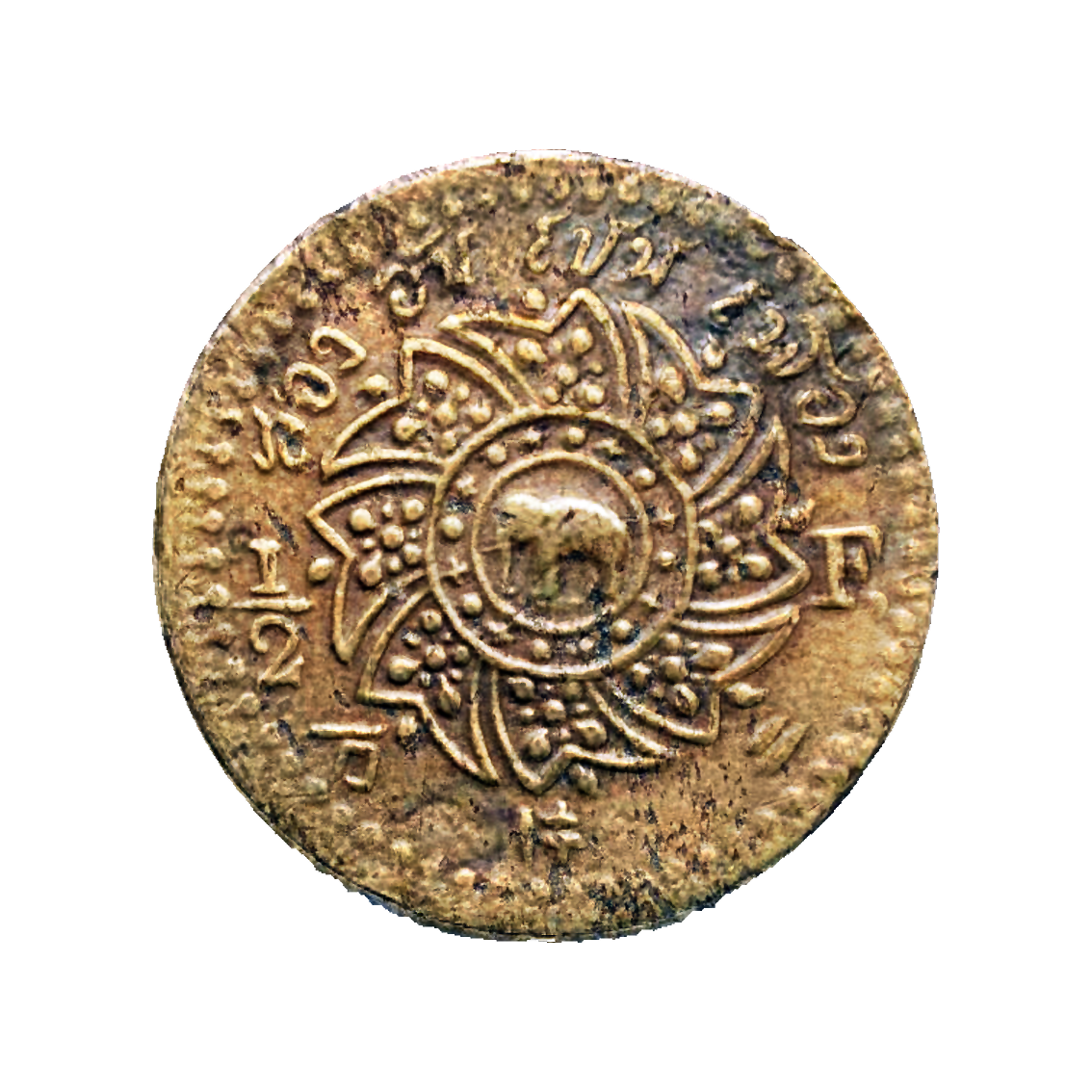
1862-brass

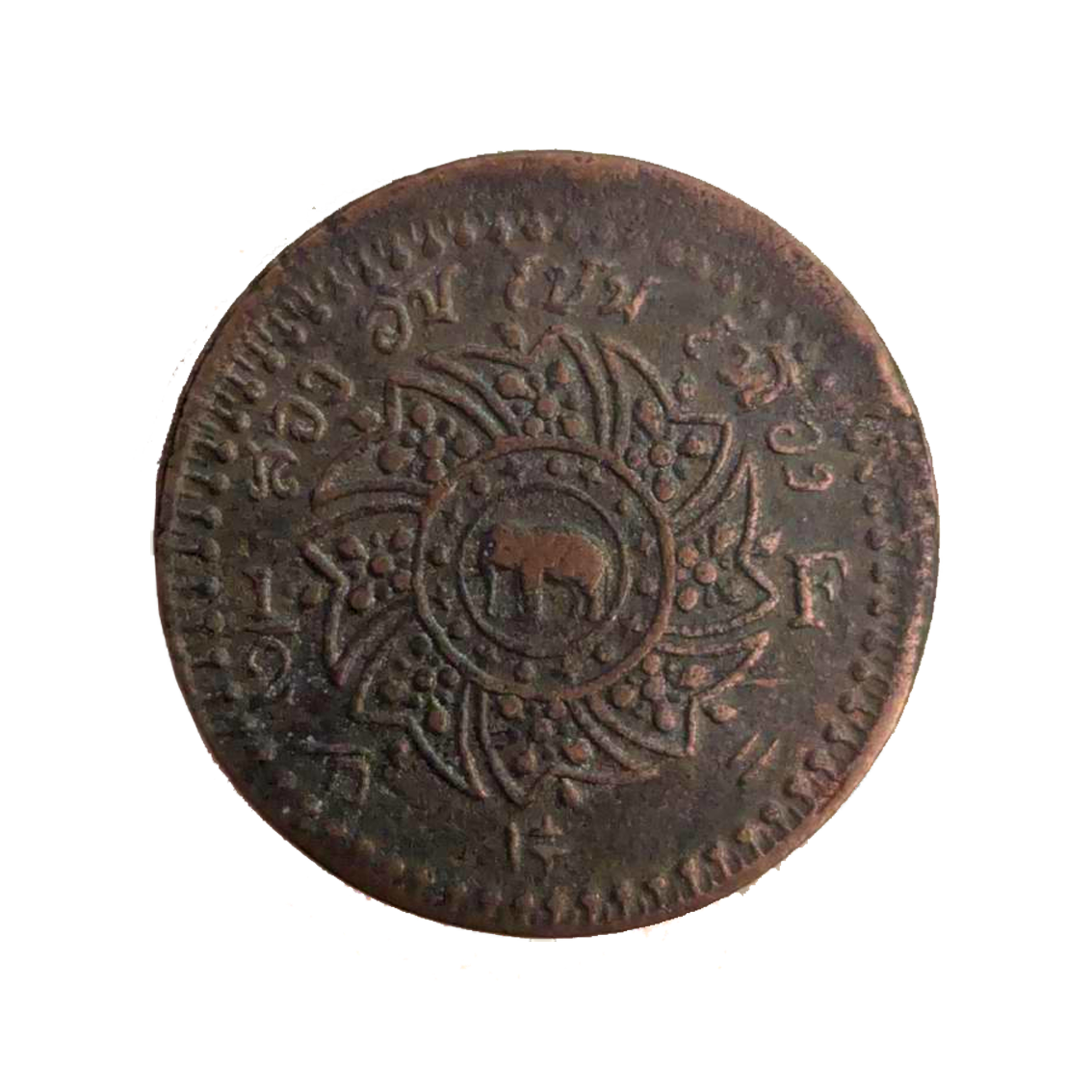
1862-copper

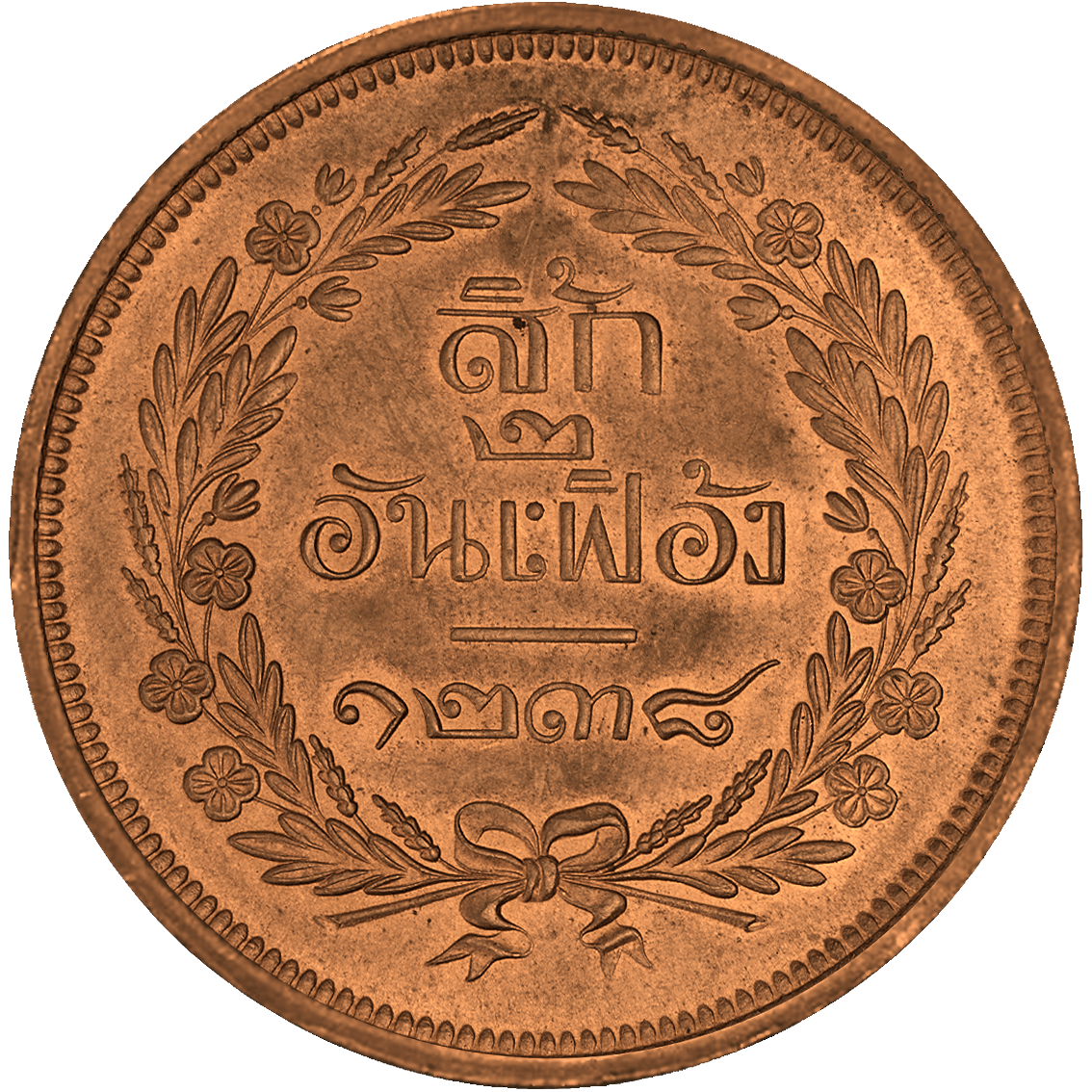
1876

== Etymology ==
The term sik (Thai: ซีก) is a native Thai linguistic term meaning "half" or "one side of a split object". Within the historical Siamese monetary framework, this designation reflected its status as exactly one-half of a silver fueang (เฟื้อง). Because it occupied this fractional tier, two sik pieces were legally required to equal one fueang, and sixteen sik pieces constituted one standard silver baht (tical). Additionally, because the coin held exactly four times the value of an at (1/64 baht), machine-struck iterations under King Chulalongkorn frequently stamped both texts onto the physical planchet, designating the piece simultaneously as "Sik, two makes a fuang"

== History ==
=== The Bullet Money Era ===
For generations spanning the Ayutthaya Kingdom to the early Rattanakosin era, the state minted fractional silver lumps known as podduang (bullet money). A silver podduang at the sik weight profile sat at roughly 0.85 grams. Because manually hammering such small pieces of silver uniformly was labor-intensive, and because merchants frequently faced a scarcity of low-tier silver pieces, minor marketplace trades often bypasses these tiny metal units entirely, favoring bulk transactions settled via cowrie shells (bia) imported from the Indian Ocean.

=== Machine-Struck Currency Reforms ===
Siam's reliance on hand-poured gambling house tokens (phi) and cowrie shells collapsed following the mid-19th century commercial surge triggered by the Bowring Treaty. Recognizing the urgent necessity for high-volume, standardized base-metal coins to lubricate domestic retail trade, King Mongkut (Rama IV) imported European coin presses and constructed a mechanical minting workshop inside the walls of the Grand Palace.

The first flat, machine-struck copper sik coins debuted alongside the smaller denominations in 1862. By replacing variable commodities with heavily structured base-metal fractions, the Siamese crown successfully claimed a monopoly over small change, easing accounting friction for local merchants and Western trading hubs alike.

== Design ==
=== The Rama IV Star Wheel Series (1862) ===
The premier mechanical sik production run under King Mongkut utilized heavy copper and brass planchets.

- Obverse: Displays the multi-tiered royal crown surrounded by decorative stylized branches.
- Reverse: Showcases a dynamic elephant standing inside a multi-pointed discus wheel (Chakra). The frame features no date text, but carries an explicit value stamp reading “ซีก สอง อัน เปน เฟื้อง” ("Sik, two pieces make a Fueang").

=== The Chulalongkorn Monogram Series (1874–1882) ===
When King Chulalongkorn (Rama V) inherited the throne, domestic infrastructure expansion forced the crown to outsource minting contracts abroad to handle volume requirements, shipping bulk production orders to specialized hubs like the Birmingham Mint in England. This era's coins are noted for their exceptional thickness and significant physical footprint.

- Obverse: Features the stylized Royal Monogram จปร (Chor Por Ror), representing the King's personal cipher, beautifully crowned by the Great Crown of Victory (Phra Maha Phichai Mongkut).
- Reverse: Features the explicit valuation ซีก ๒ อันเฟื้อง (Sik, 2 pieces [equal] a Fueang). The statement is centered and surrounded by a detailed botanical wreath of woven Cassia javanica (Java cassia) branches and rice leaves.
- Dating: This collection uses the Chula Sakarat (CS) civil calendar system, with widespread issues stamped with dates ๑๒๓๘ (CS 1238 / 1876 CE) and ๑๒๔๔ (CS 1244 / 1882 CE)

== Demonetization ==
As the 20th century neared, running a binary-influenced pre-decimal fractional currency alongside modern international decimalized banking standards proved too clunky and inefficient. King Chulalongkorn pushed forward with systematic decimalization, dropping production metrics for the legacy copper fractions.

The copper sik was stripped of its legal tender status on May 17, 1909, by royal decree. The entire non-decimal system was formally replaced by the modern decimal baht and satang (100 satang = 1 baht) system. Following demonetization, the Royal Thai Mint recalled old copper and bronze fractions like the sik from public hands, melting the stocks down to act as raw material blanks for early 1-satang bronze pieces.

== See also ==
- Thai baht
- Solot coin
- Siao coin
- Fuang coin
