= One-fuang coin =

Denomination of the Thai baht

1 fuang
- Thailand
- Value: 1/8 Thai baht
- Mass: (1860-1869) 1.94 g (1869-1908) 1.89 g
- Diameter: (1860-1869) 16.0 mm (1869-1876) 15.30 mm (1876-1908) 15.67 mm
- Edge: Reeded
- Composition: (1860-1908) silver
- Years of minting: 1860-1908

Obverse
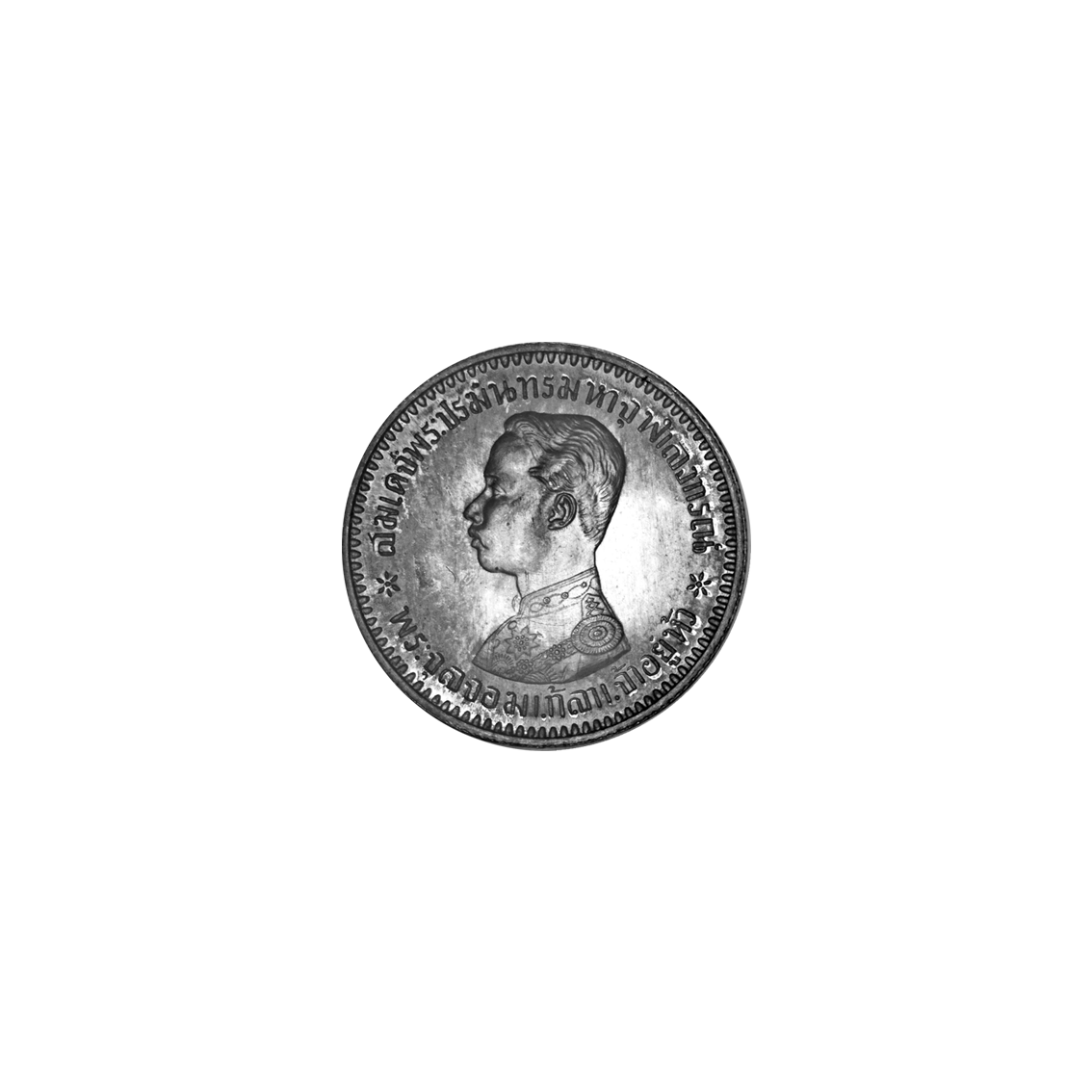
- Design date: 1876

Reverse
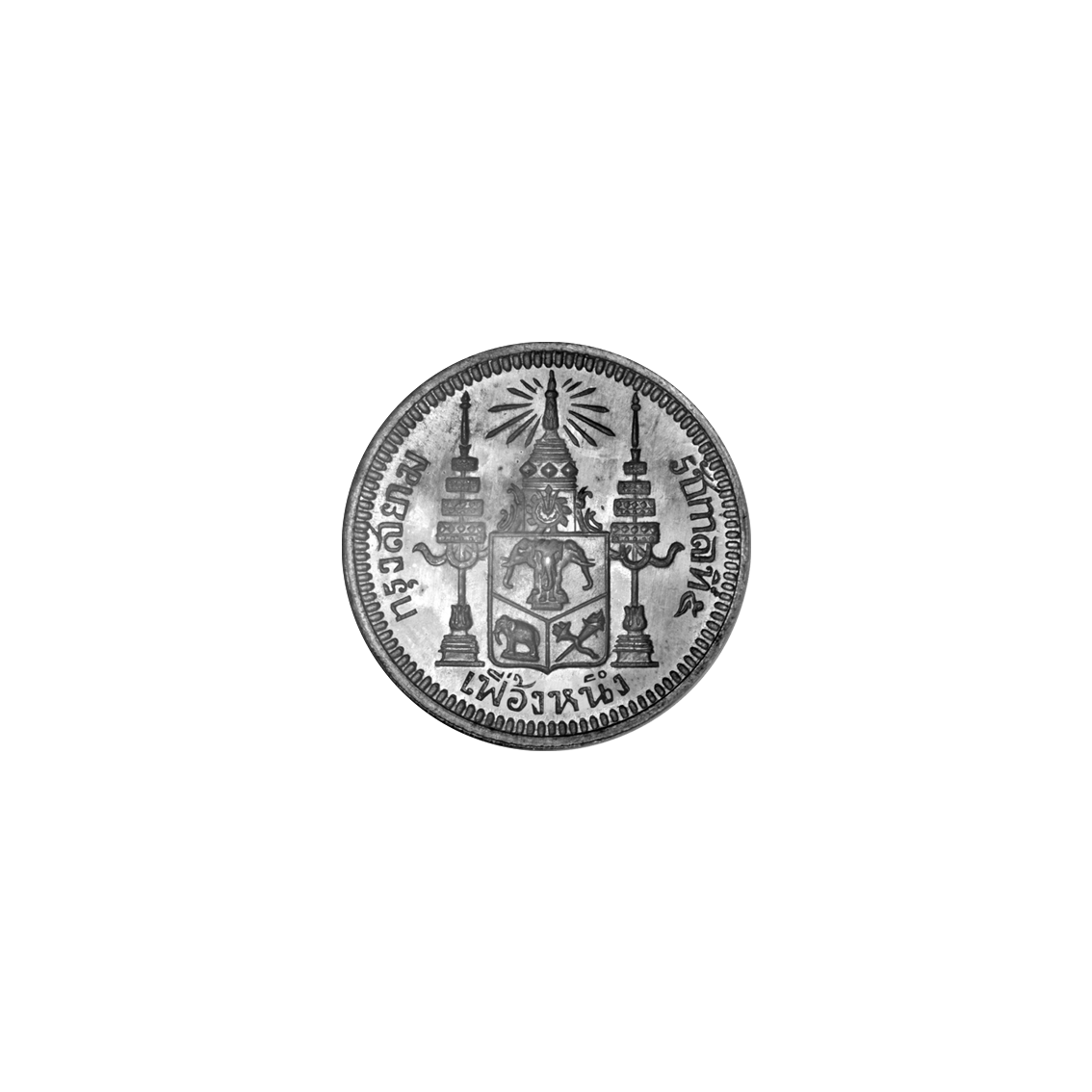
- Design date: 1876

The 1 fuang coin (Thai: เฟื้อง) piece, or the eight at coin was a mid-range denomination used in the traditional, pre-decimal currency system of Siam (modern-day Thailand). The fuang (เฟื้อง) represented a value of 1/8 of a baht, sitting between the larger salung and smaller denominations such as the sik and siao. As an important everyday unit, the 1 fuang coin circulated widely throughout the Rattanakosin period.

Evolution of fuang

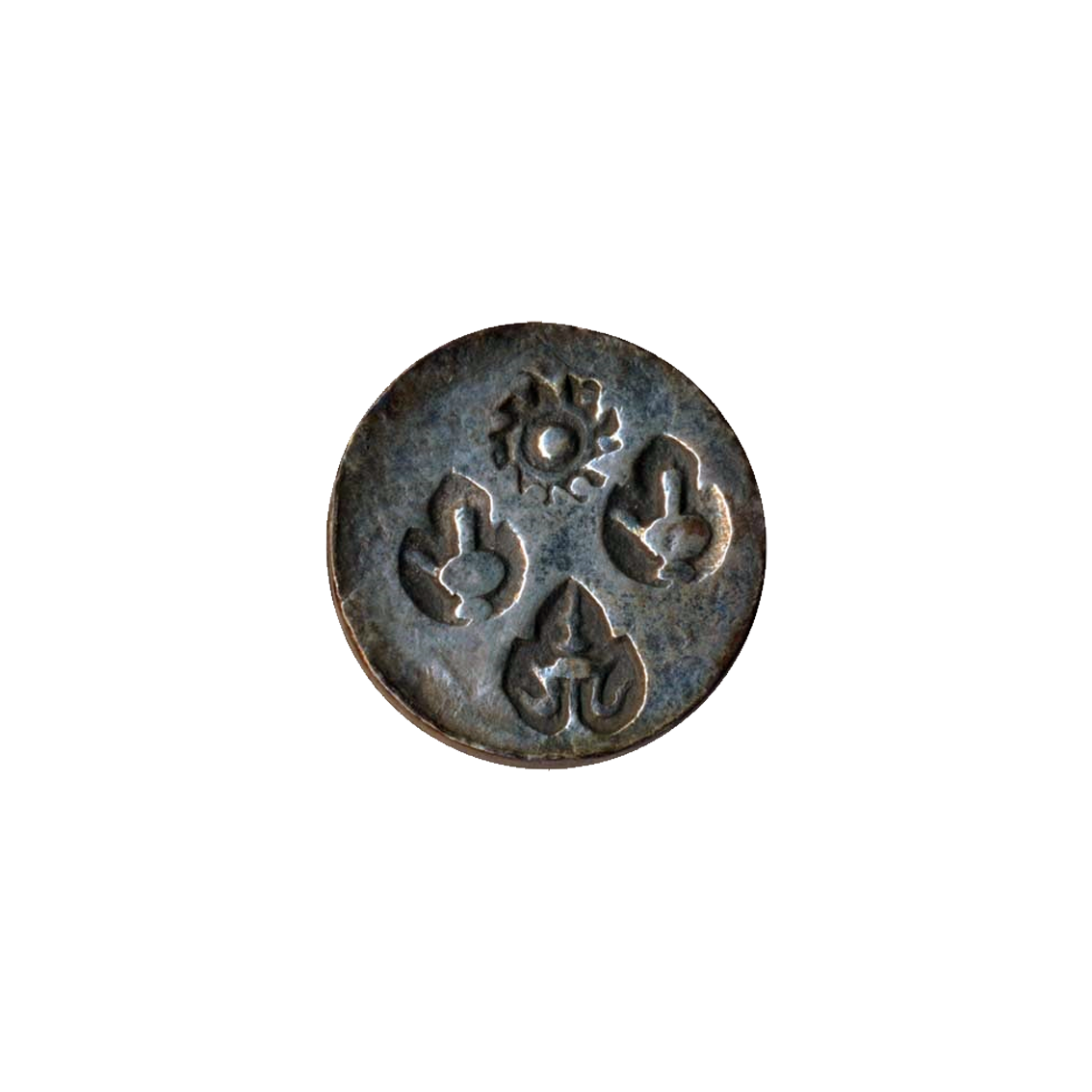
1856-trial coin

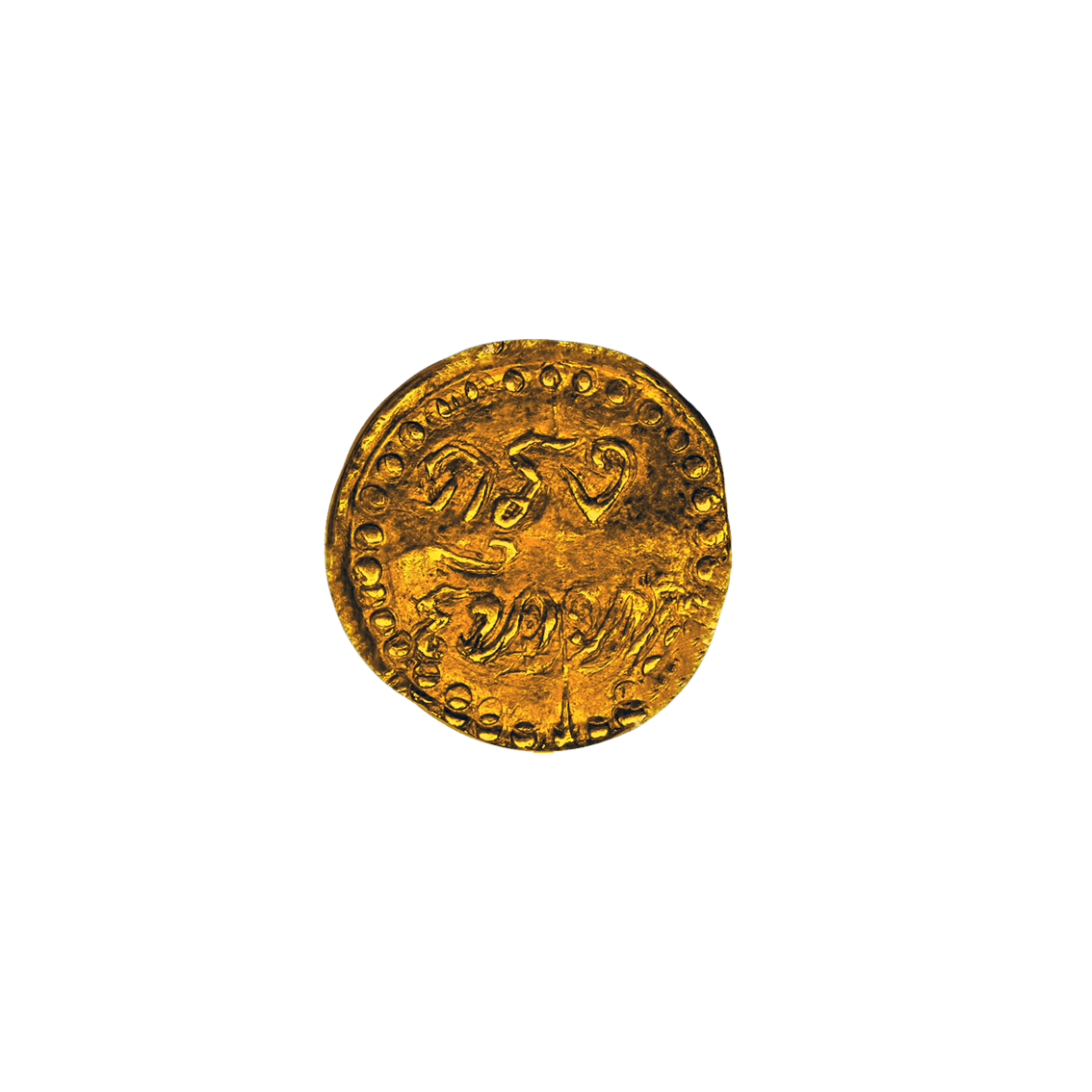
1856-trial coin

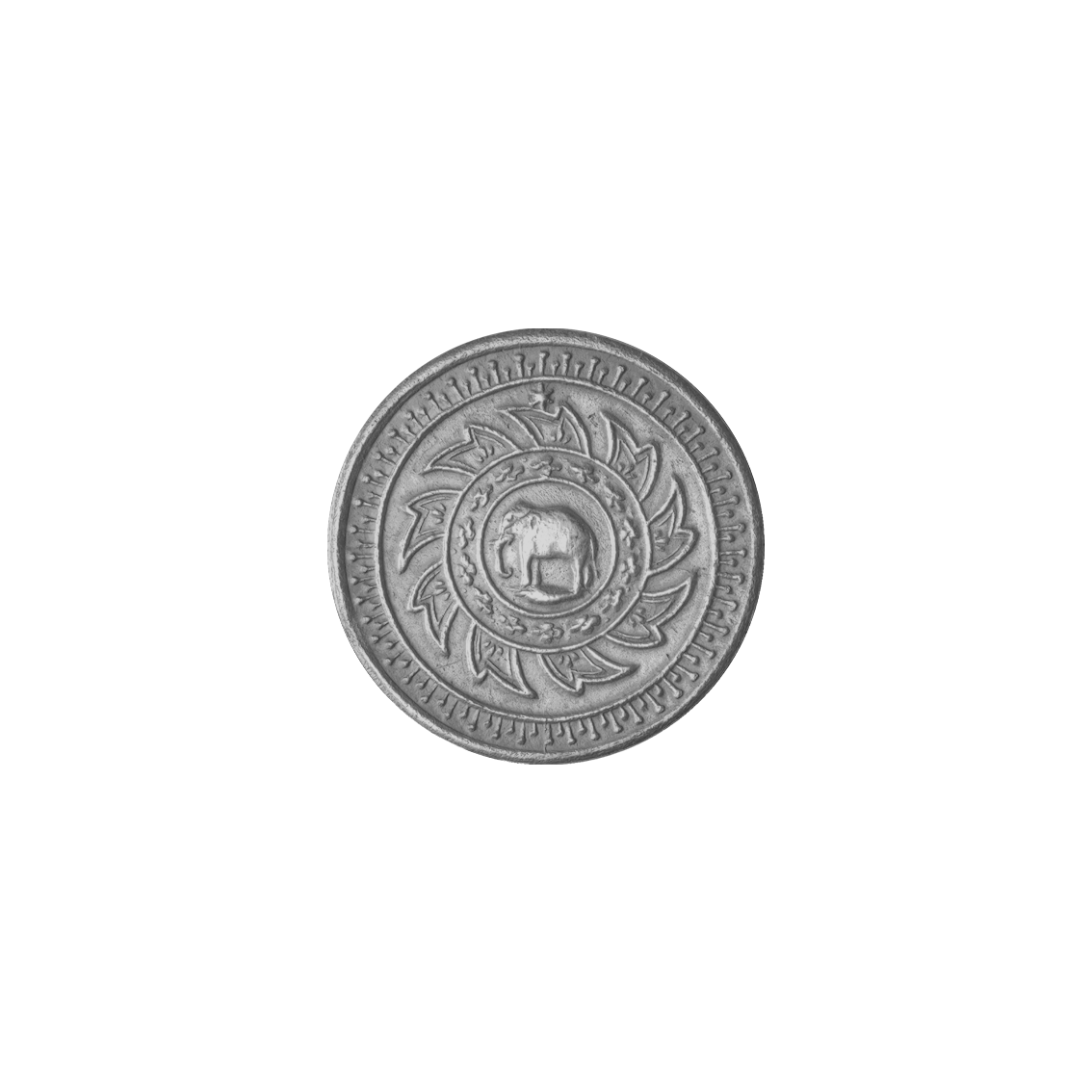
1862

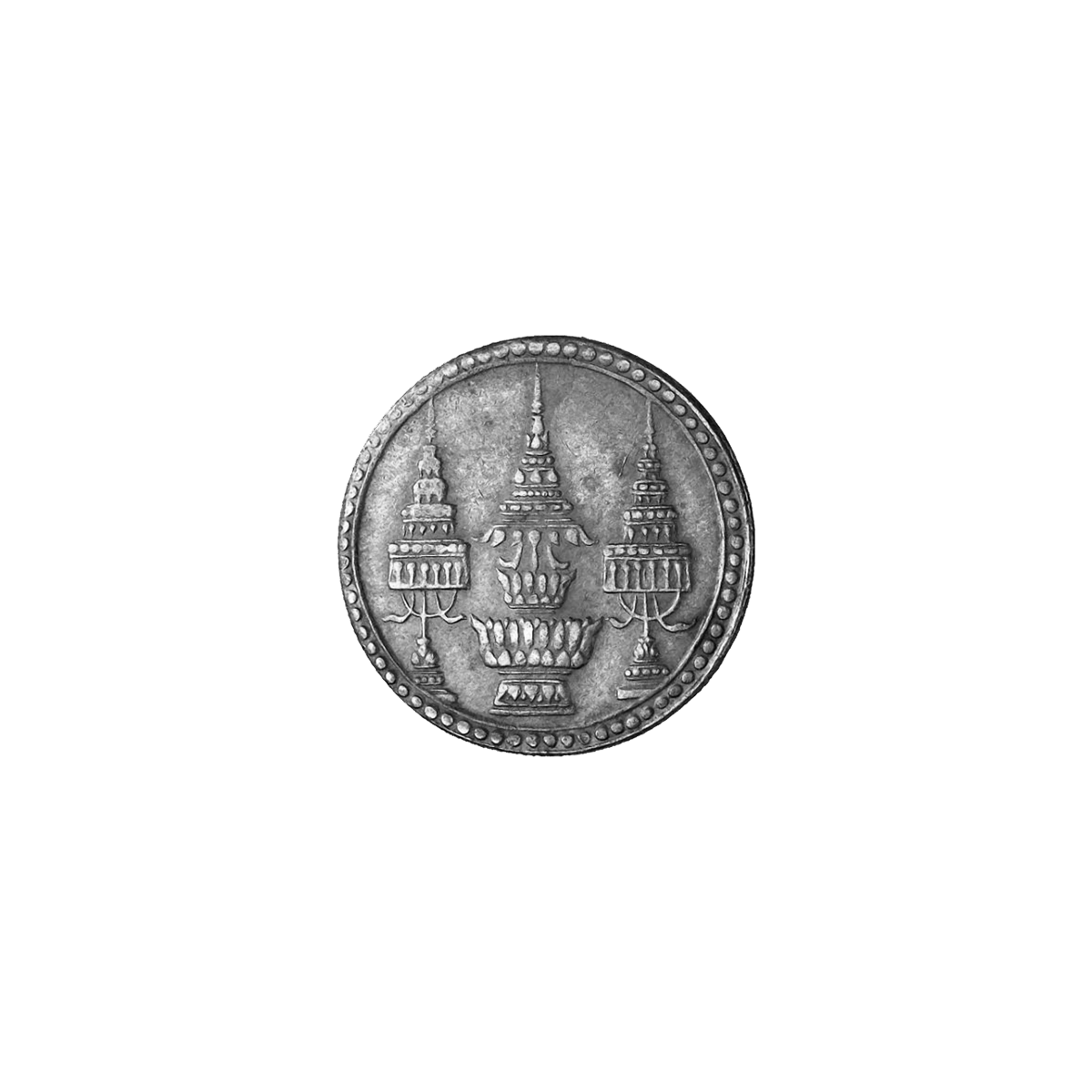
1869

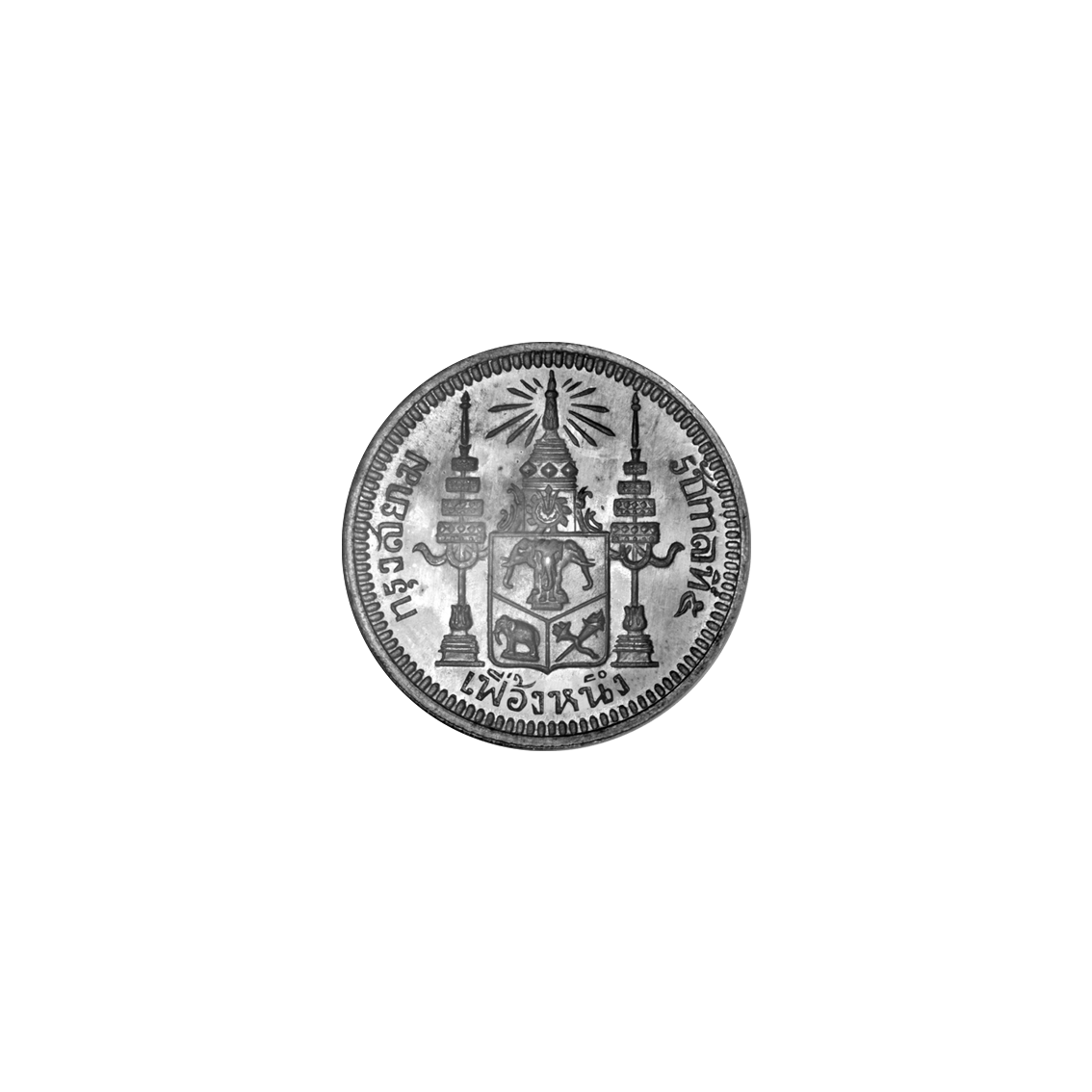
1876

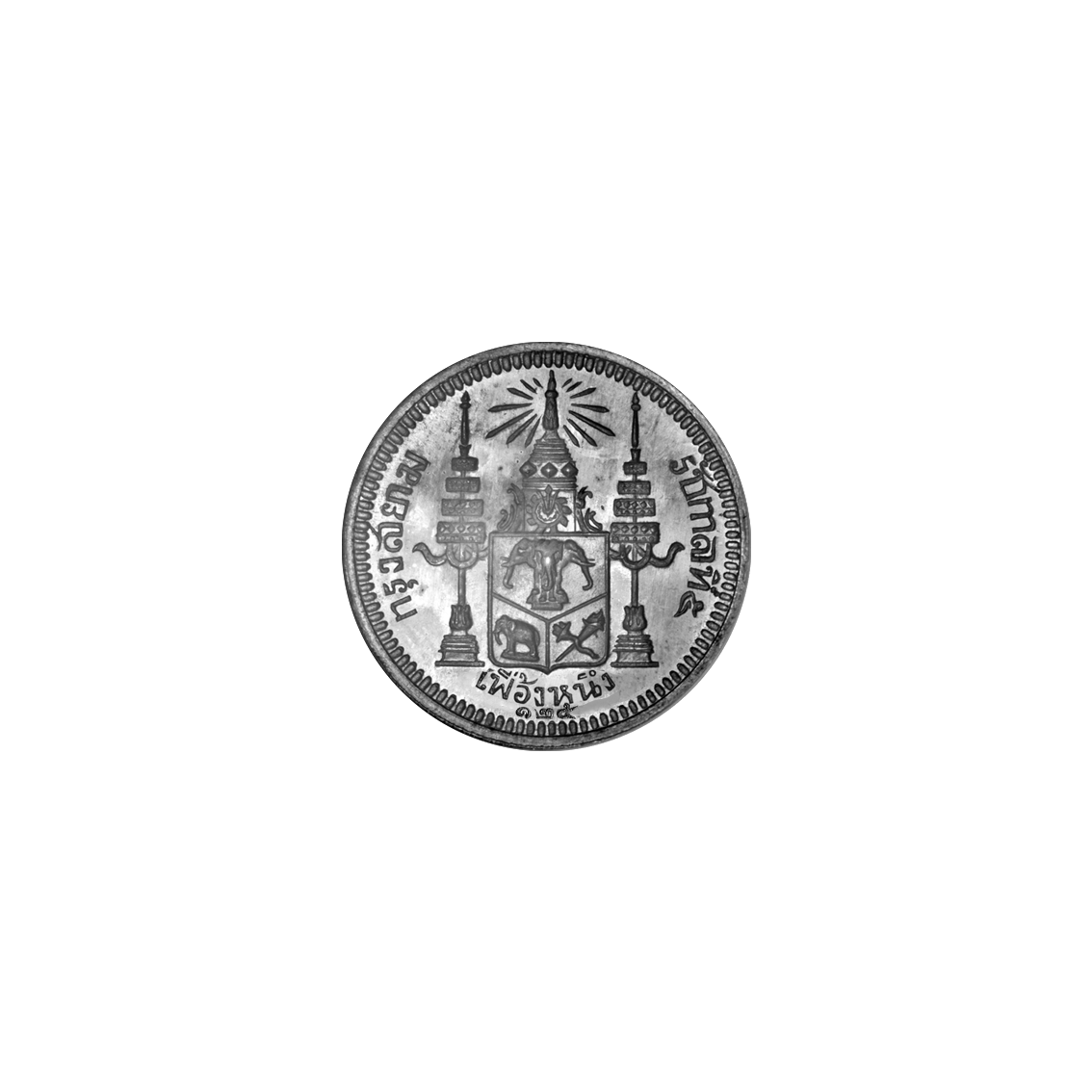
1901

== See also ==
- Thai baht
- Solot coin
- Siao coin
- Sik coin
