= One-siao coin =

Denomination of the Thai baht

1 siao
- Thailand
- Value: 1/32 Thai baht
- Mass: (1860-1874) 7.55 g (1874-1888) 11.35 g (1888-1905) 11.30 g
- Diameter: (1860-1874) 22mm (1874-1888) 31 mm (1888-1905) 30 mm
- Edge: Smooth
- Composition: (1860-1905) copper
- Years of minting: 1860-1905

Obverse
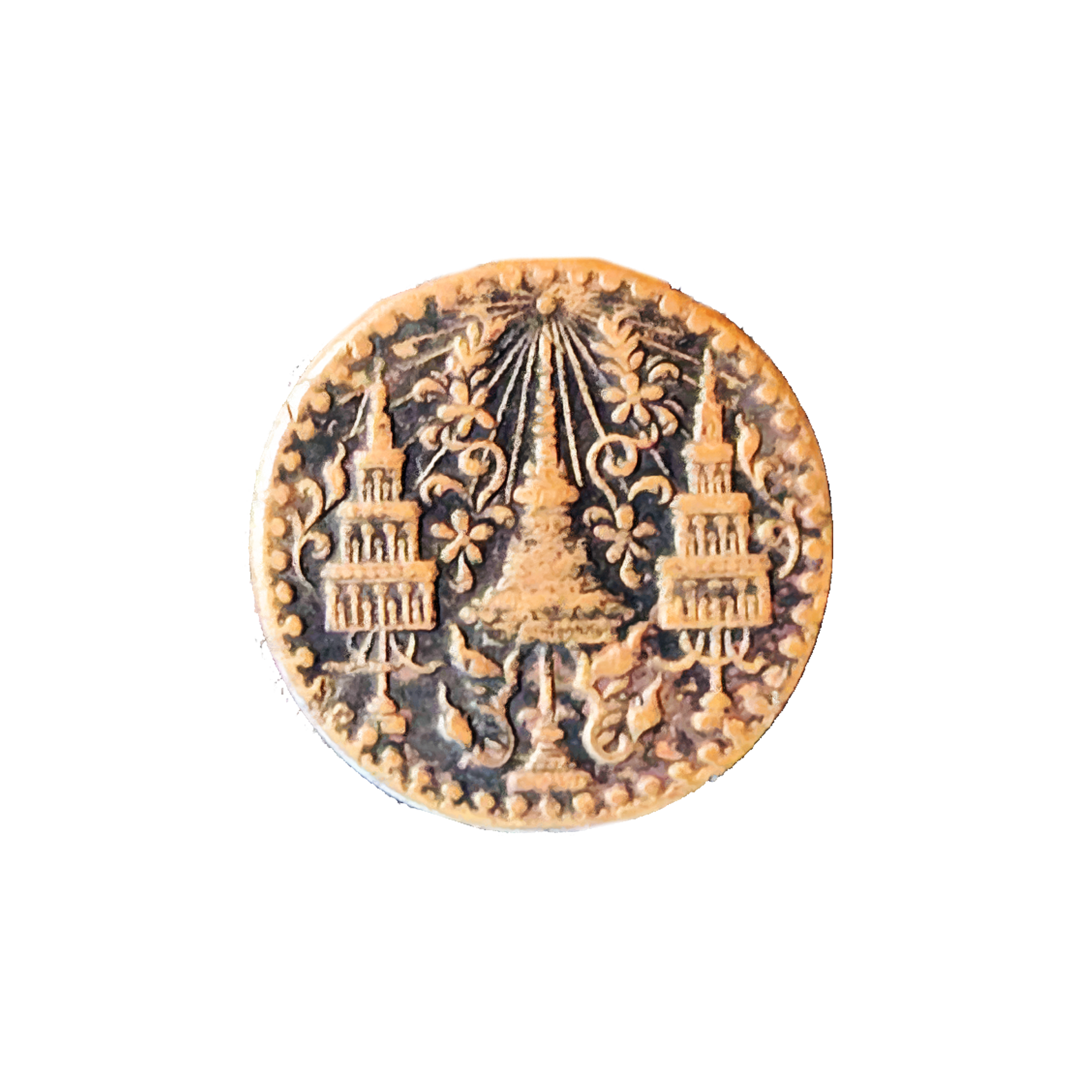
- Design date: 1862

Reverse
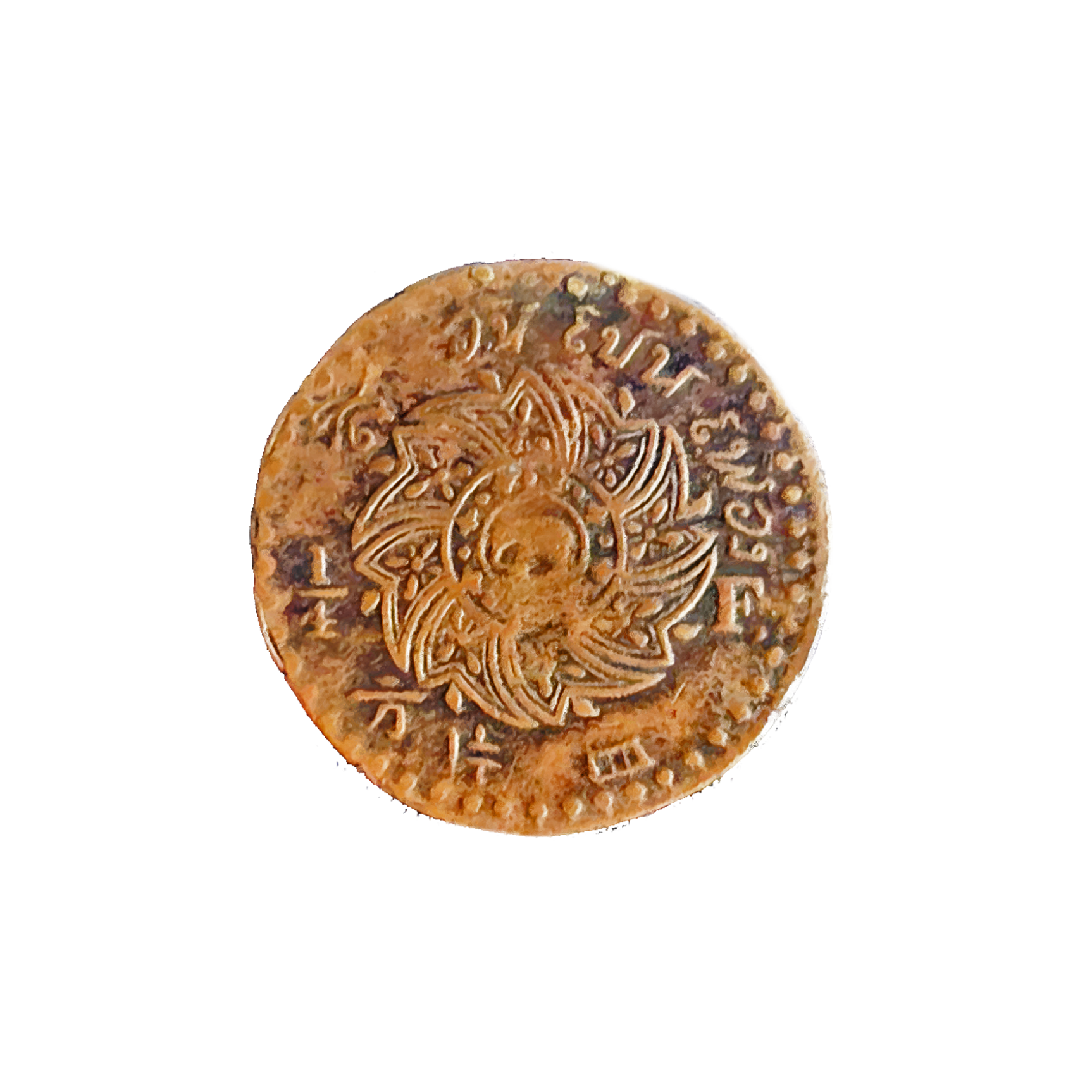
- Design date: 1862

The siao coin (Thai: เสี้ยว or เซียว) piece, or the two at coin was a fractional-denomination coin used in the pre-decimal currency system of Siam (modern-day Thailand). The siao (เสี้ยว) represented a unit valued at 1/2 of a fuang or 1/32 of a baht, placing it among the smaller circulating denominations of the traditional baht-based system. Early siao coins were produced in the distinctive podduang (bullet money) form characteristic of Siamese coinage, while later issues transitioned to flat, struck metal coins during the 19th century monetary reforms. The siao coin remained in use until Thailand adopted the decimal baht–satang currency system in the early 20th century.

It is also called pai when it was a podduang(Thai: ไพ).

Evolution of siao

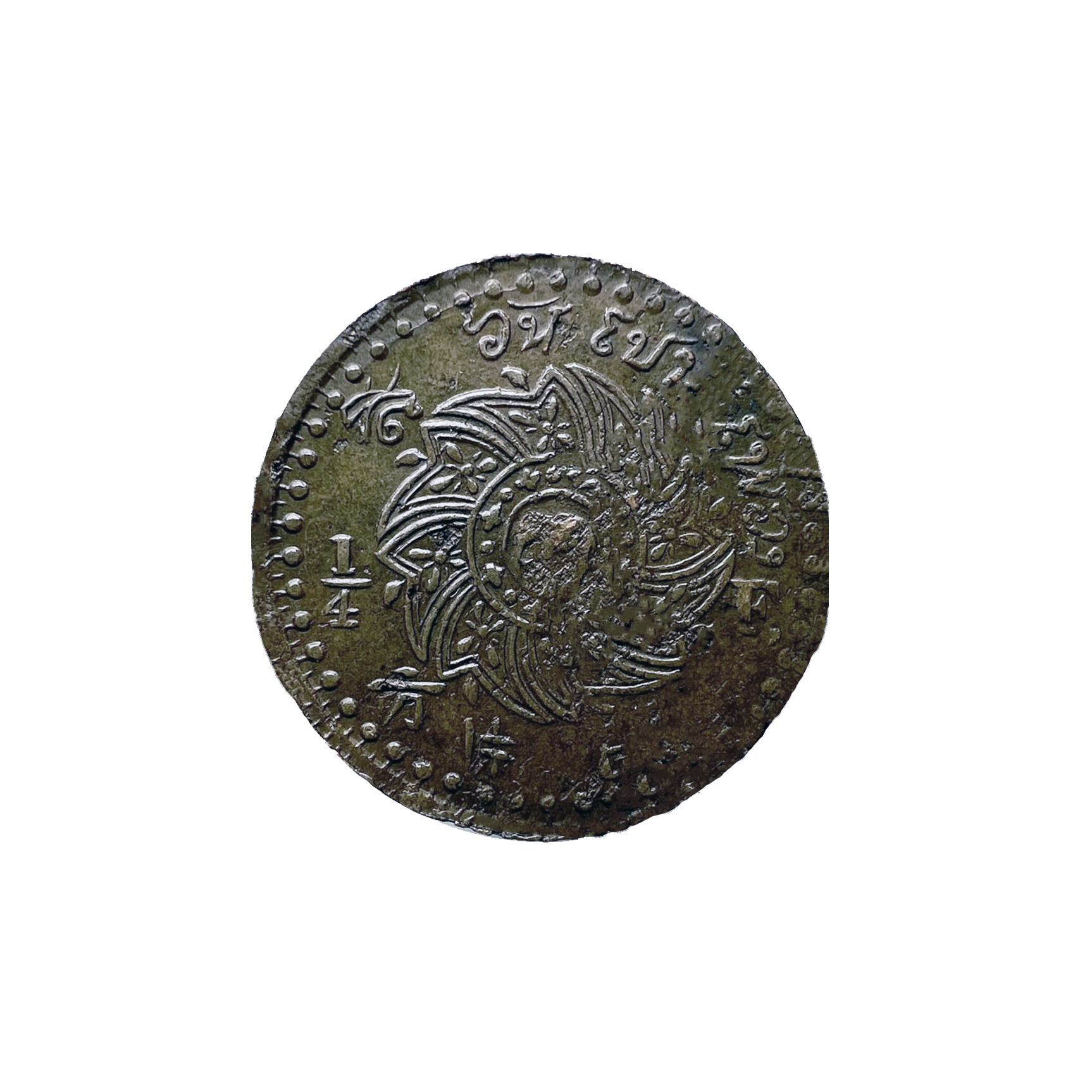
1962-brass

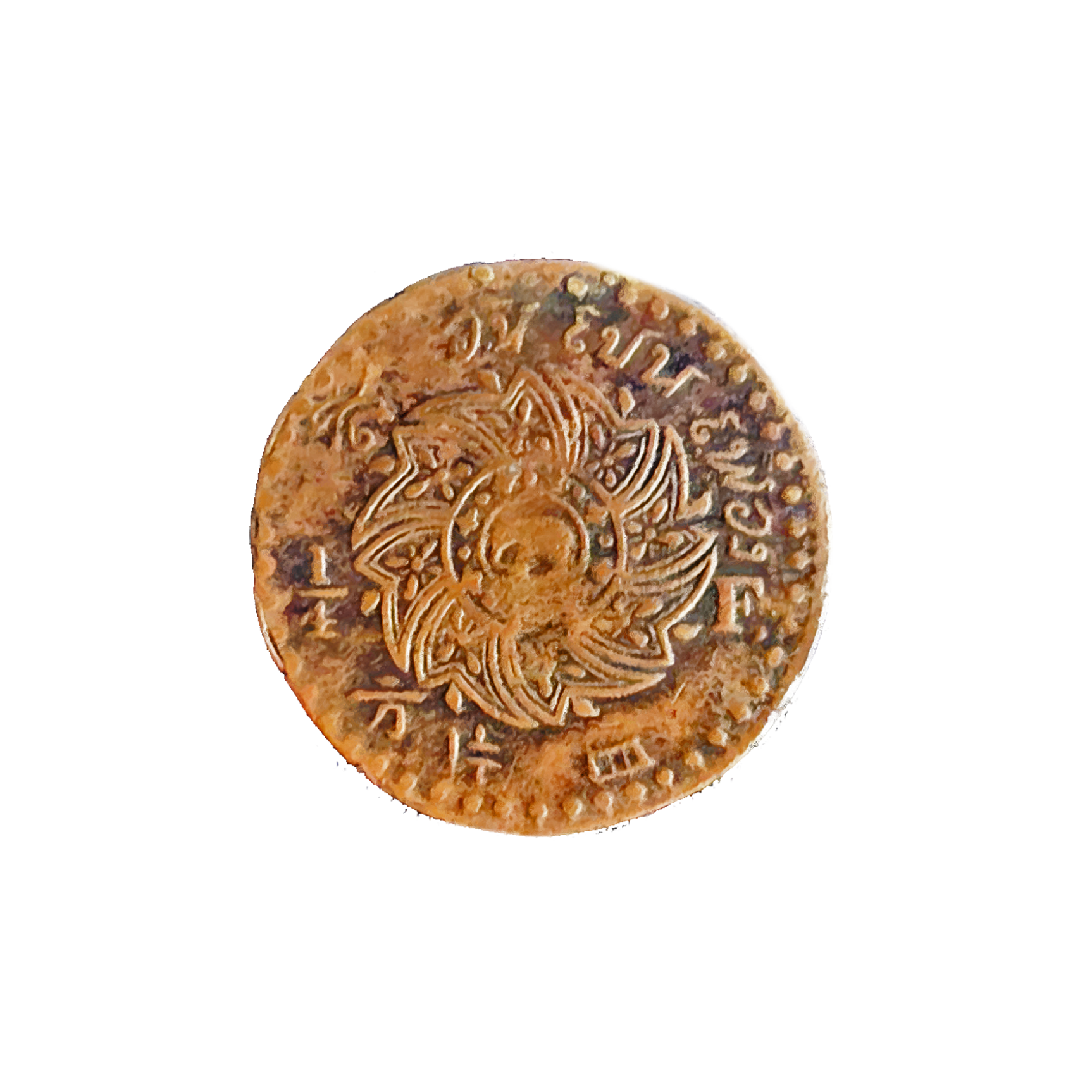
1862-copper

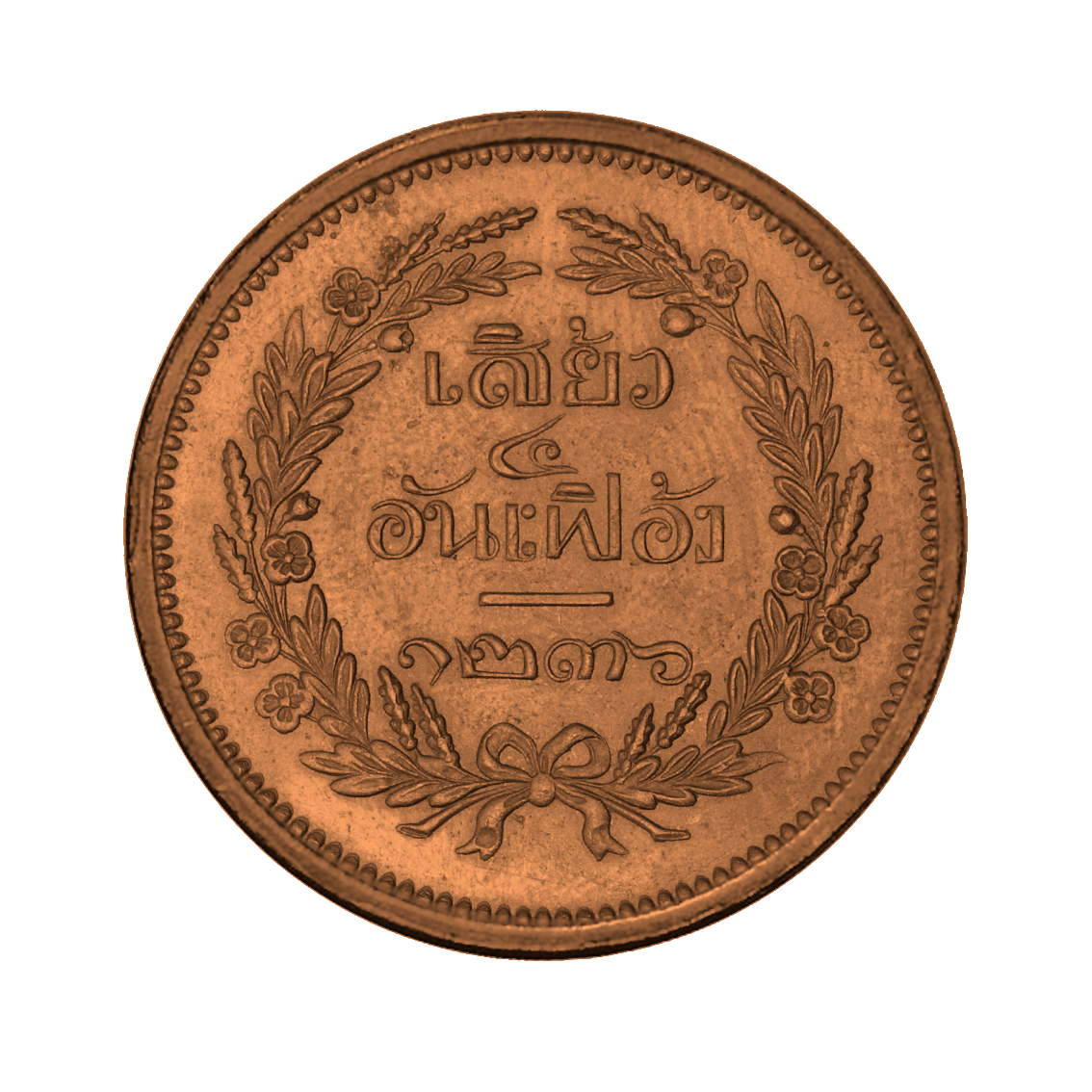
1876

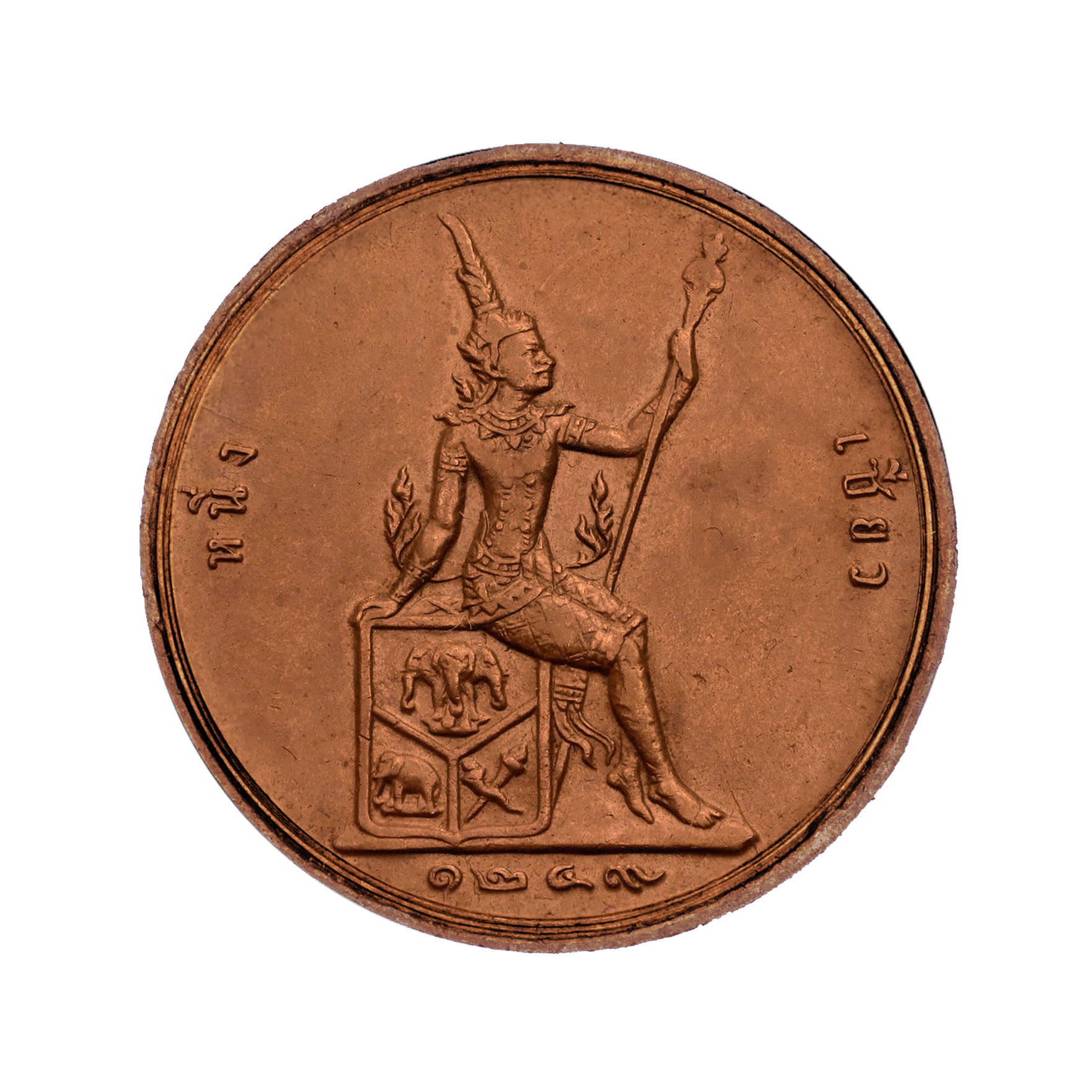
1888

== Etymology ==
The term siao (Thai: เสี้ยว) is a native Thai word literally translating to "a quarter" or "one-fourth piece". This nomenclature corresponds exactly to its mathematical position inside the historical currency matrix, where four siao pieces were legally required to equal one silver fueang (เฟื้อง). Positioned directly between the sik (half-fuang) and the at (one-eighth fuang).It was also historically called a pai (Thai: ไพ) when produced as a podduang.

== History ==
=== Early productions ===
Before industrialized minting, transactions corresponding to the value of a siao were difficult to settle uniformly. While the state cast tiny silver podduang (bullet money) at the siao weight, their minuscule physical size made them highly impractical for daily marketplace commerce and prone to loss. Consequently, everyday micro-transactions were largely settled using imported cowrie shells (bia), with roughly 400 to 800 shells equalling one siao depending on fluctuating market supply. For localized commerce, the state also tolerated the use of hand-poured clay, lead, or pewter tokens known as prak or phi, which were originally issued by local gambling houses (rong huai) to facilitate change.

=== Transition to Machine-Struck Coinage ===
By the mid-19th century, increased international trade following the signing of the Bowring Treaty exposed the inefficiencies of Siam's traditional currency. To phase out gambling tokens and cowrie shells, King Mongkut (Rama IV) established the first mechanical minting facility within the Grand Palace.

The first flat, machine-struck siao pieces were introduced around 1862. Unlike the smaller denominations which experimented with soft tin alloys, the early siao was struck primarily from copper and brass. These pieces featured the Royal Crown on the obverse, and an elephant inside a multi-pointed star wheel (Chakra) on the reverse.

== Designs ==
=== The Chulalongkorn Monogram Series (1875–1883) ===
Following the ascension of King Chulalongkorn (Rama V), the Royal Mint was modernized, and production demands for base-metal fractions surged. To scale supply, the Siamese government contracted the Birmingham Mint in England to supply high-volume copper blanks and dies. This series is recognized for its thick planchets and uniform alignment.

- Obverse: Features the stylized Royal Cipher of King Rama V, containing the interlocking Thai characters จปร (Chor Por Ror for Chulalongkorn Paramin R), surmounted by the Great Crown of Victory (Phra Maha Phichai Mongkut).
- Reverse: Features the explicit textual value inscription เสี้ยว ๔ อันเฟื้อง (Siao, 4 pieces [equal] a Fueang). The text is elegantly framed by a woven botanical wreath composed of Cassia javanica (Java cassia) foliage and ears of rice.
- Dating: Coins from this minting period bear traditional numbers from the Chula Sakarat (CS) civil calendar, with the most common issues stamped with the years ๑๒๓๖ (CS 1236 / 1875 CE) and ๑๒๔๔ (CS 1244 / 1883 CE).

=== The Phra Siam Devadhiraj Series (1888–1905) ===
In 1888, a major aesthetic overhaul was introduced across all fractional copper coins. This series abandoned traditional geometric and monogram designs in favor of Western-style regal portraiture, intended to project a modernized national image to global empires.

- Obverse: Displays a left-facing bust profile of King Chulalongkorn in military uniform. The outer rim is inscribed with his royal title written in Thai script.
- Reverse: Features a detailed depiction of Phra Siam Devadhiraj—the anthropomorphic guardian deity and national personification of Siam—seated on a stylized throne and holding a trident. The deity leans on a shield containing the tripartite Siamese Royal Coat of Arms, which visually represented Siam proper (the three-headed Erawan elephant), Lan Xang/Laos (the white elephant), and the Malay vassal states (crossed krises). The text flanking the figure explicitly clarifies the denomination as ๑ เสี้ยว (1 Siao).
- Dating: This series discarded the Chula Sakarat system, initiating production with the brief Chula Sakarat year ๑๒๔๙ (CS 1249 / 1888 CE) before moving cleanly to the Rattanakosin Era (RS) calendar, which calculated years from the founding of Bangkok in 1782. Notable subsequent siao mintages bear dates such as ร.ศ. ๑๑๕ (RS 115 / 1896 CE), ร.ศ. ๑๒๑ (RS 121 / 1902 CE), and ร.ศ. ๑๒๒ (RS 122 / 1903 CE).

== Demonetization ==
By the opening decade of the 20th century, the co-circulation of the non-decimal binary system alongside modern international accounting standards caused persistent systemic inefficiencies. In anticipation of full decimalization, the Royal Mint slowed production of copper fractions.

The siao, along with the at, solot, and other legacy fractional pieces, was officially stripped of its legal tender status on May 17, 1909, through the royal decree of King Rama V. The ancient system was wholly replaced by the decimal baht and satang (100 satang = 1 baht) system. Following their demonetization, vast reserves of copper and bronze siao pieces were melted down by the state to provide raw materials for manufacturing new decimal coins.

== See also ==
- Thai baht
- Solot coin
- Sik coin
- Fuang coin
