= Five-satang coin =

Five satang
- Thailand
- Value: 0.05 Thai baht
- Mass: 0.6 g
- Diameter: 16.5 mm
- Edge: Plain
- Composition: Aluminium; 99.% Al
- Years of minting: 1908–present
- Catalog number: KM# 208

Obverse
- Design: King Vajiralongkorn
- Designer: Vudhichai Seangern
- Design date: 2018

Reverse
- Design: Royal Monogram of King Vajiralongkorn
- Designer: Chaiyod Soontrapa
- Design date: 2018

The Thailand five-satang coin (5 st. or 5 สต.) is a unit of currency equivalent to one-twentieth of a Thai baht. It was introduced in 1908 as a coin with a hole through its middle, which was minted until 1939. In 1946 the hole was removed and the new Thai monarch featured on the obverse: Rama IX. In 1996 a five-satang coin marked the 50th anniversary of his reign.

Evolution of 5 satang

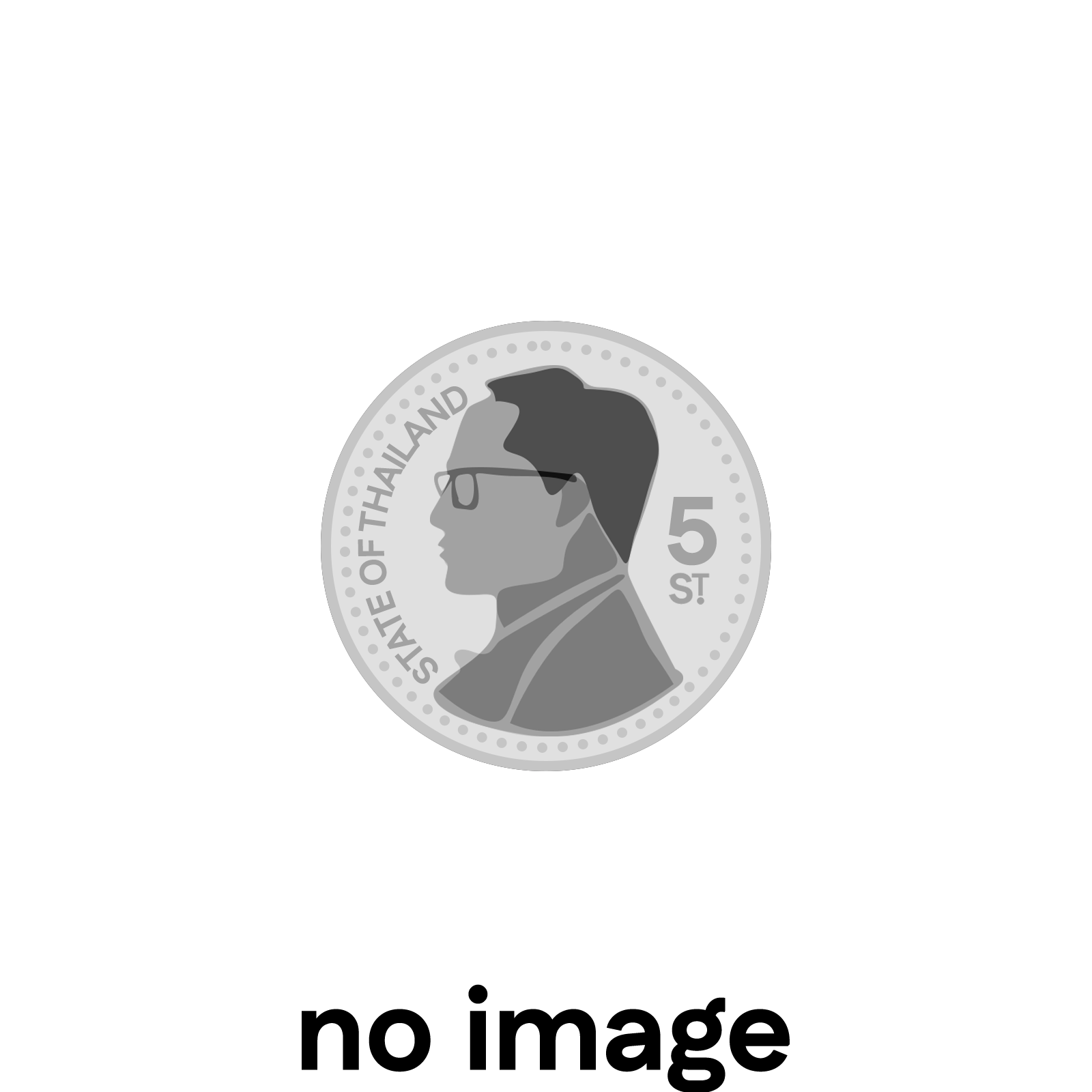
1897

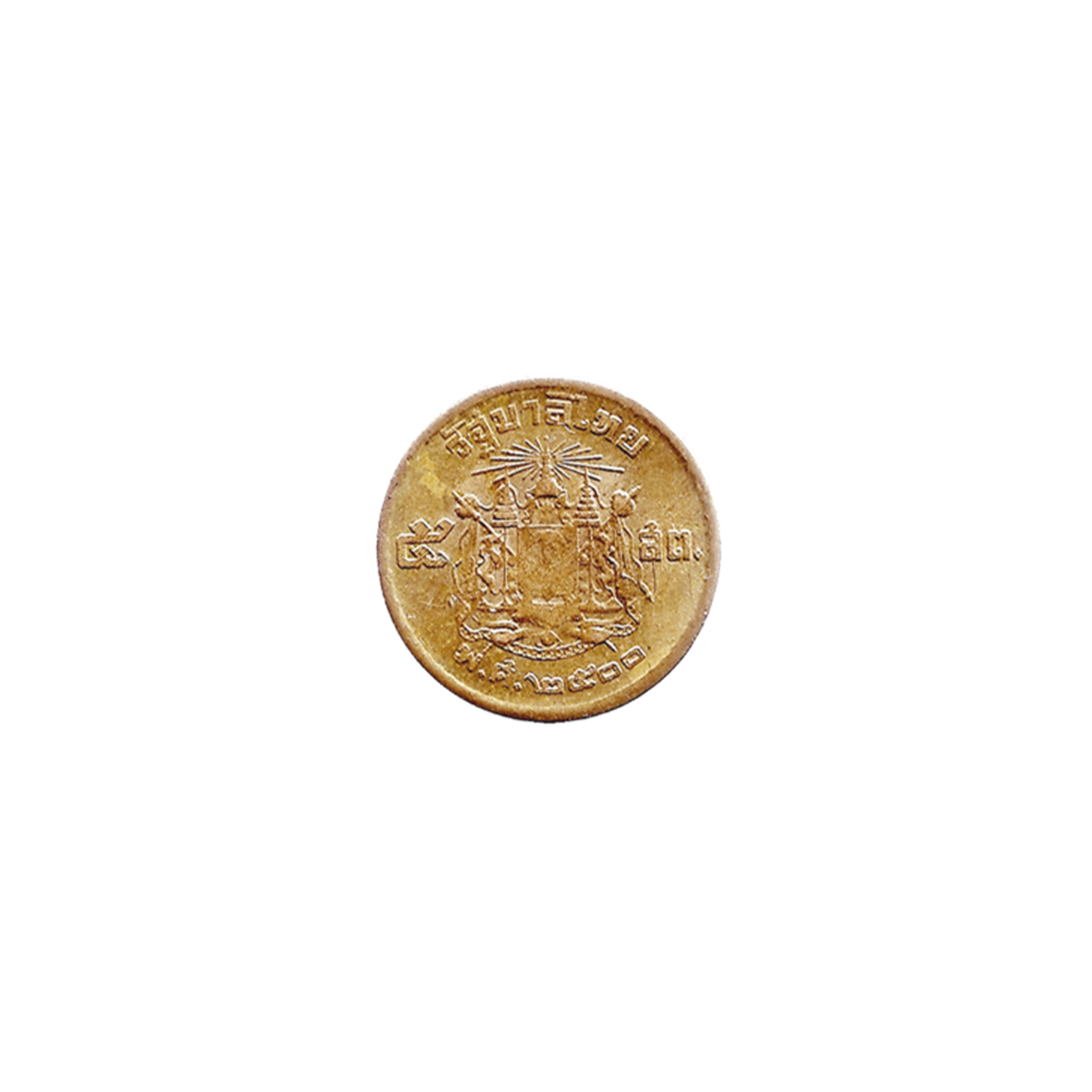
1950

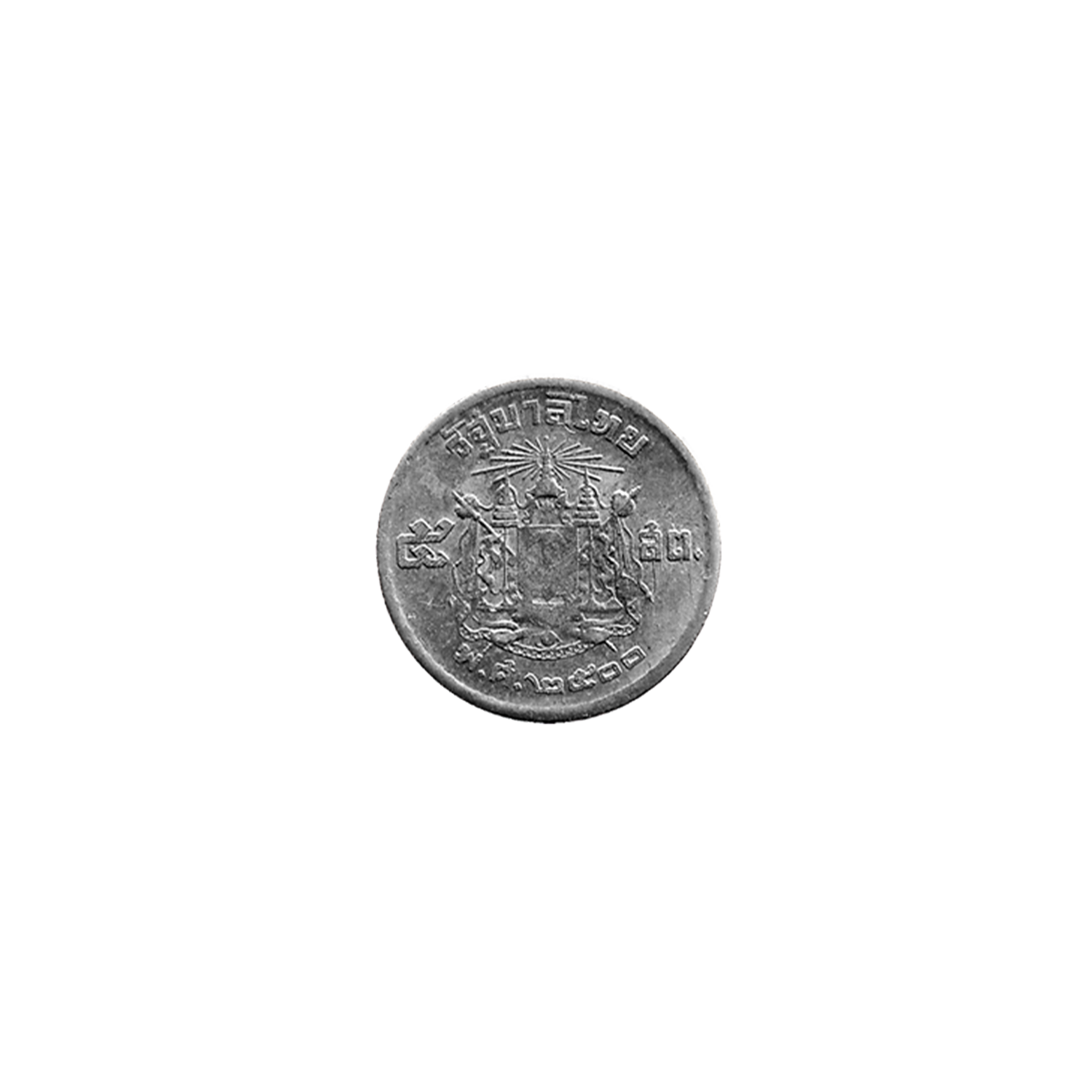
1950

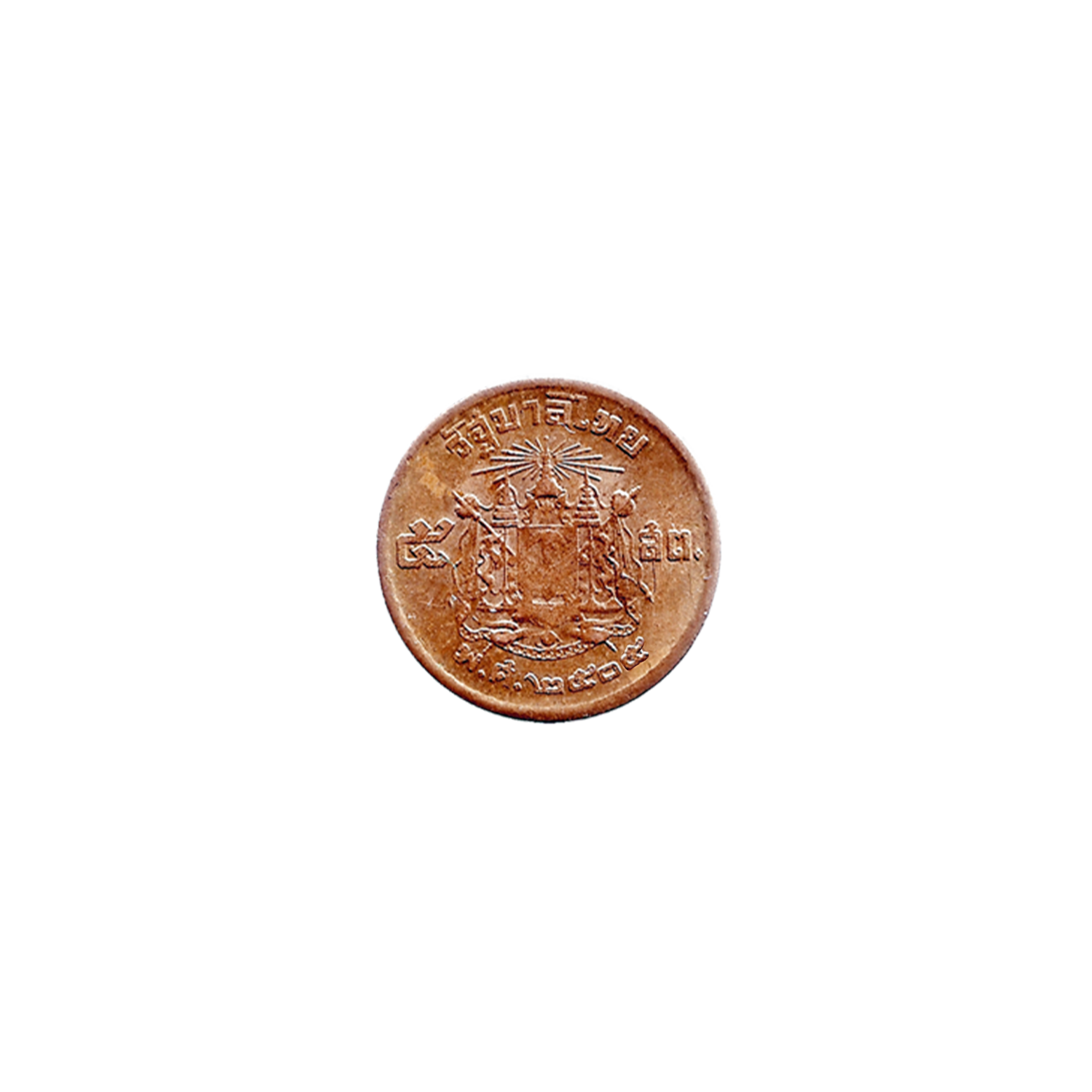
1950

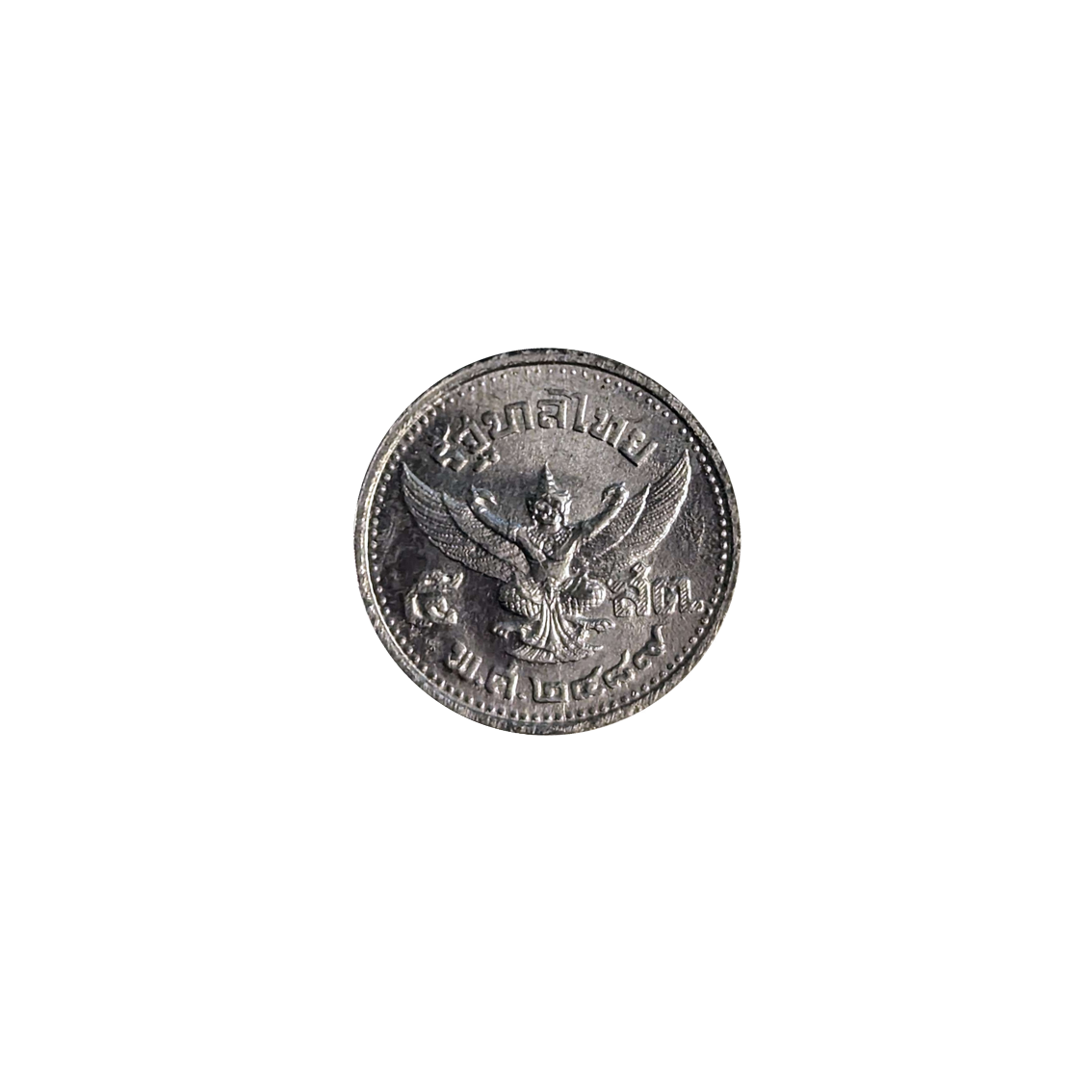
1946

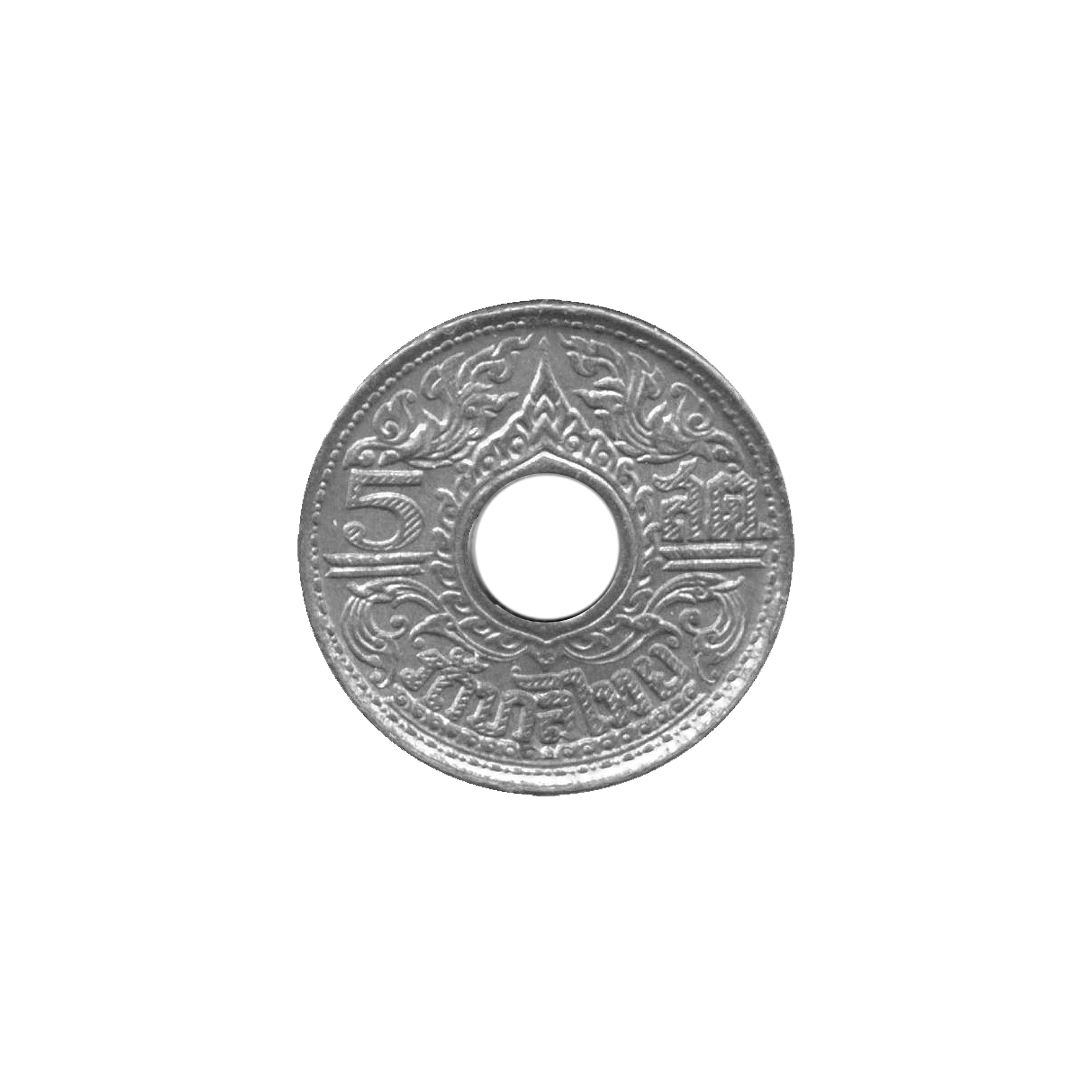
1944

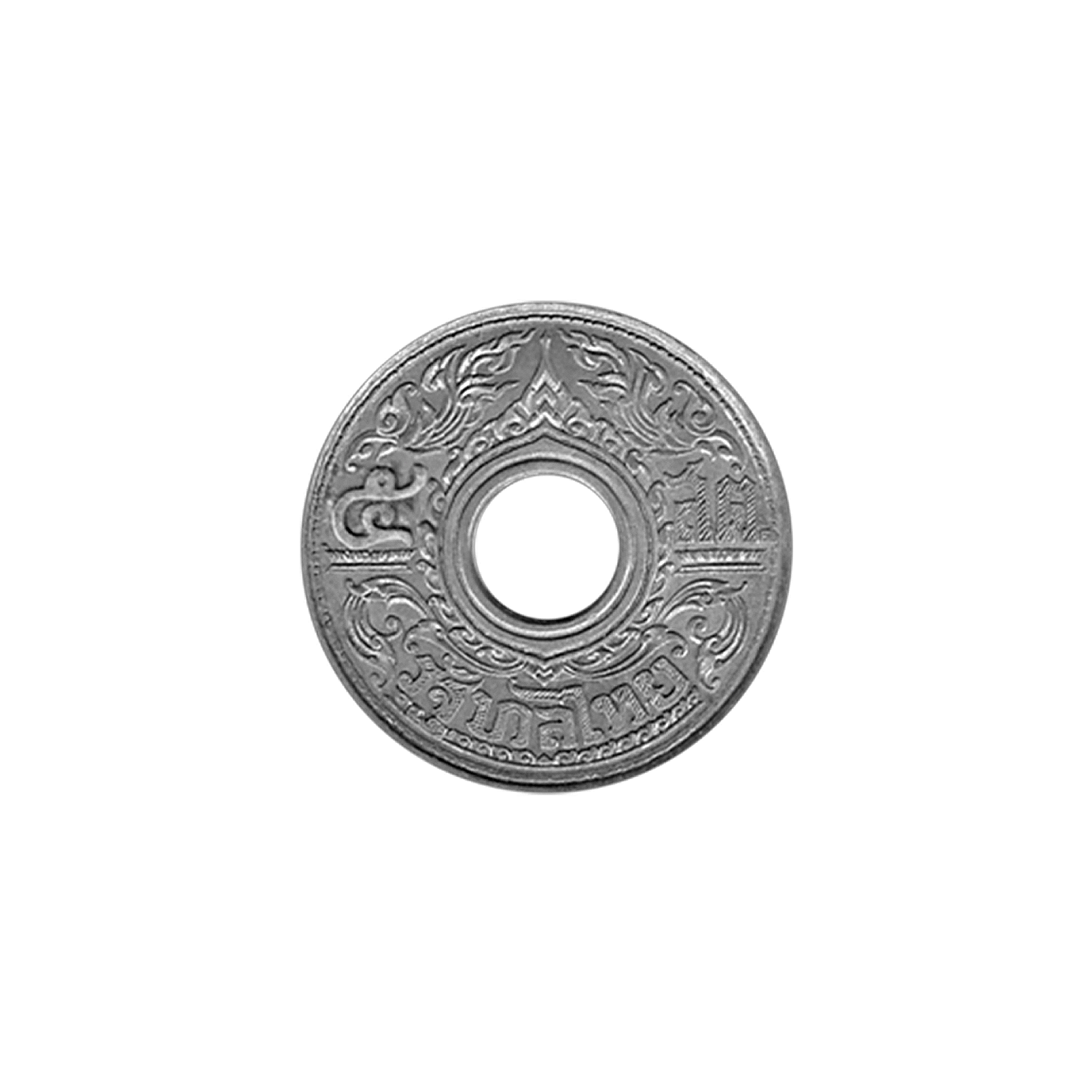
1941

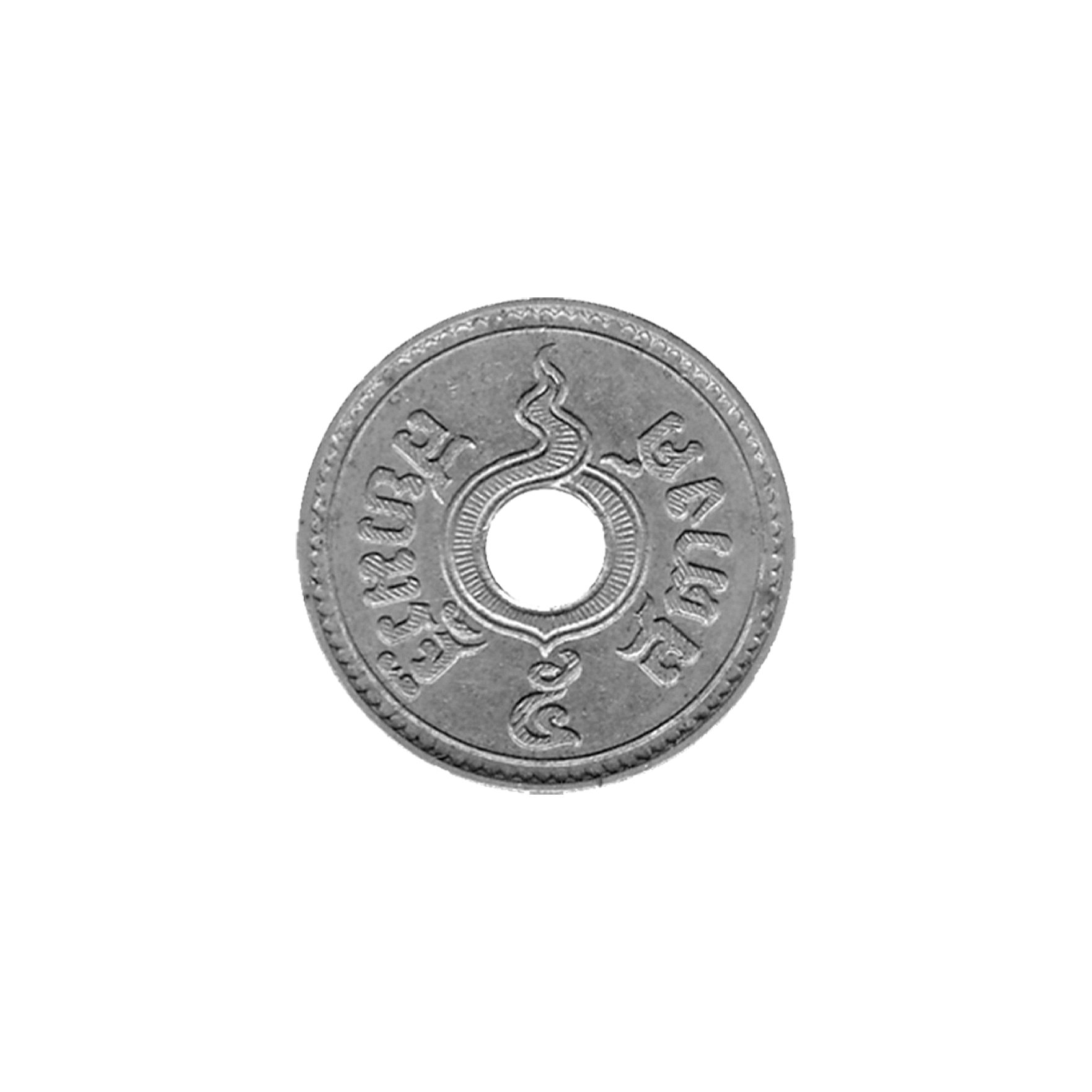
1908

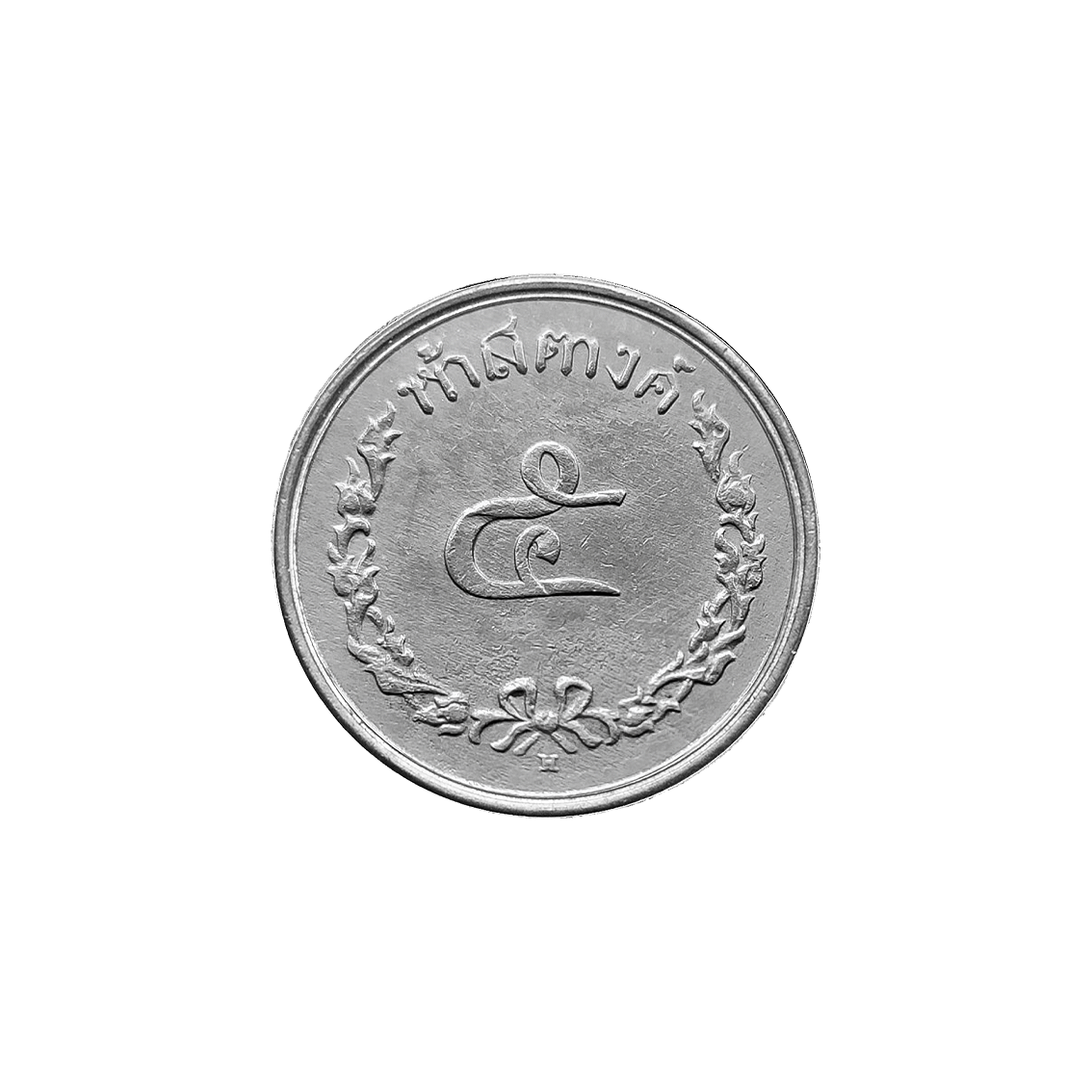
1897

== Mintages ==
- 1987 ~ 10,000
- 1988 ~ 694,000
- 1989 ~ 462,000
- 1990 ~ 368,050
- 1991 ~ 25,000
- 1992 ~ 61,000
- 1993 ~ 100,000
- 1994 ~ 500,000
- 1995 ~ 500,000
- 1996 ~ 0
- 1997 ~ 10,000
- 1998 ~ 10,000
- 1999 ~ 20,000
- 2000 ~ 10,000
- 2001 ~ 50,000
- 2002 ~ 0
- 2003 ~ 10,000
- 2004 ~ 10,000
- 2005 ~ 20,000
- 2006 ~ 3,000
- 2007 ~ 10,000
- 2008 ~ 10,000
- 2009 ~ 10,000
