= One-pit coin =

Denomination of the Thai baht

1 pit
- Thailand
- Value: 4 Thai baht
- Mass: (1863 & 1894) 3.39 g
- Diameter: (1863 & 1894) 16.0 mm
- Edge: Reeded
- Composition: (1863 & 1894) gold
- Years of minting: 1863 & 1894

Obverse
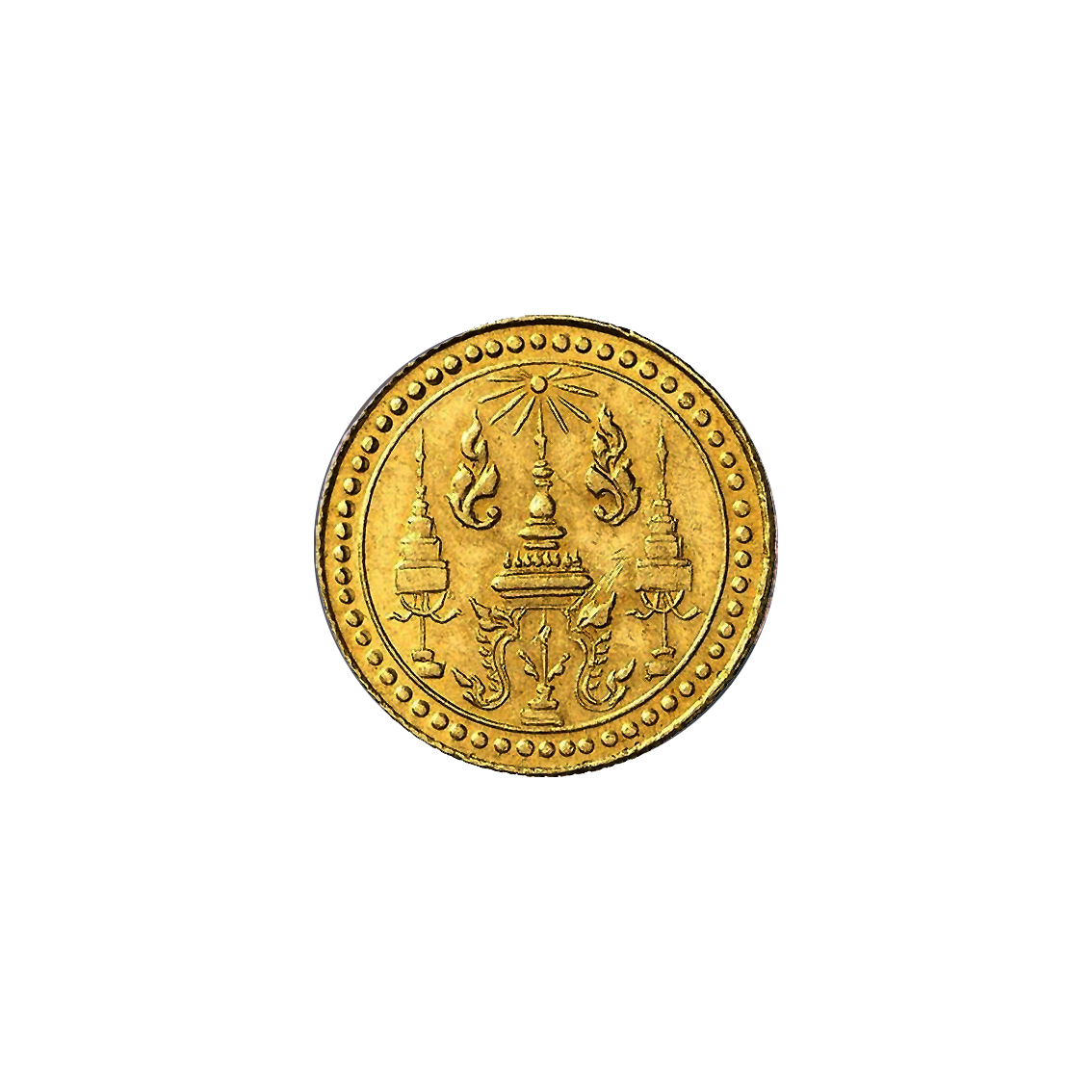
- Design date: 1863 & 1894

Reverse
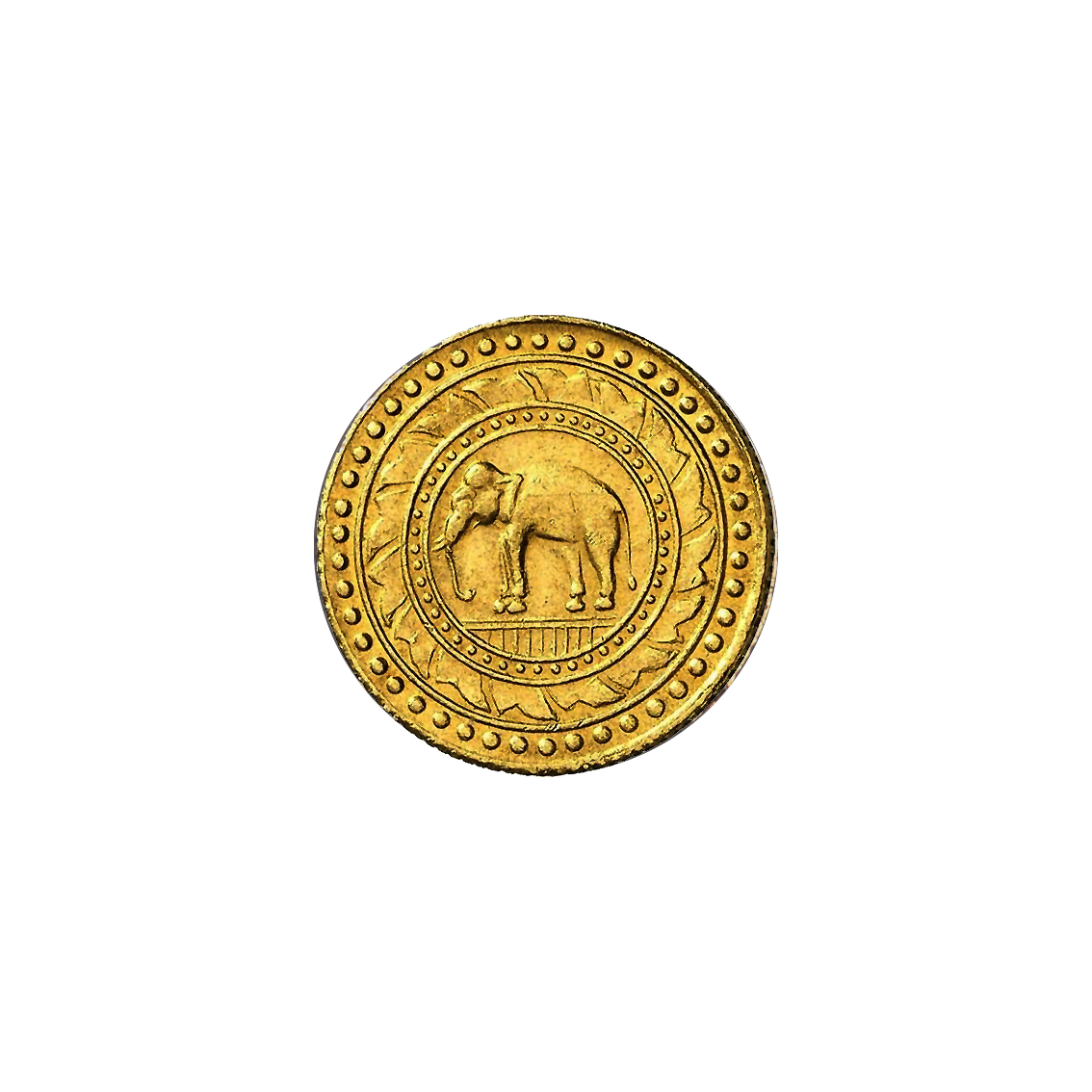
- Design date: 1863 & 1894

The pit (Thai: พิศ) was a historic Thai currency unit used during the pre-decimal era of the Thai baht. One pit was equal to 4 baht, making it one of the biggest denominations in the traditional Thai monetary system.

== See also ==
- Thai baht
