= Half-tamlueng coin =

Denomination of the Thai baht

1/2 tamlueng
- Thailand
- Value: 2 Thai baht
- Mass: (1863) 30.2 g
- Diameter: (1863) 37.0 mm
- Edge: Reeded
- Composition: (1863) silver
- Years of minting: 1863

Obverse
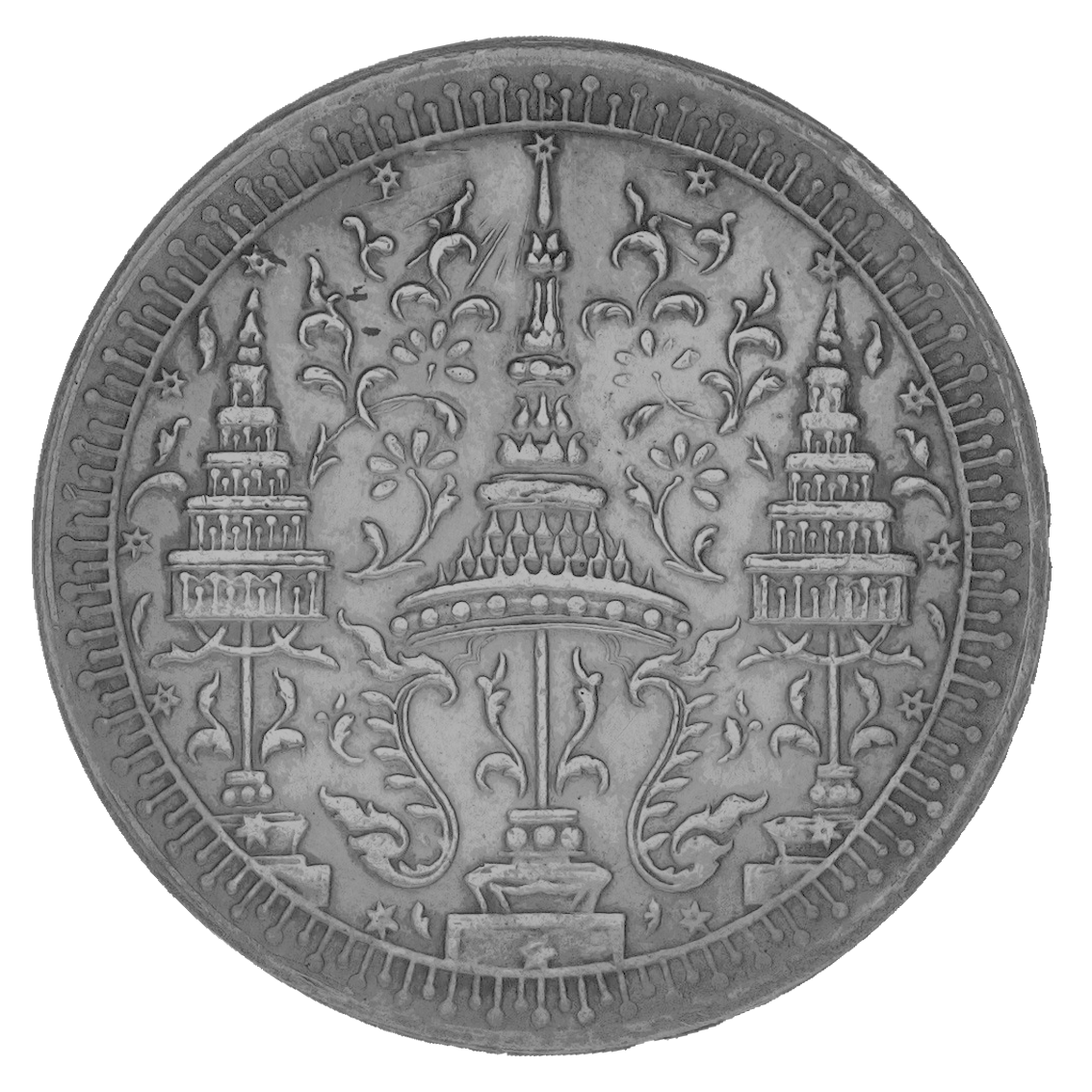
- Design date: 1863

Reverse
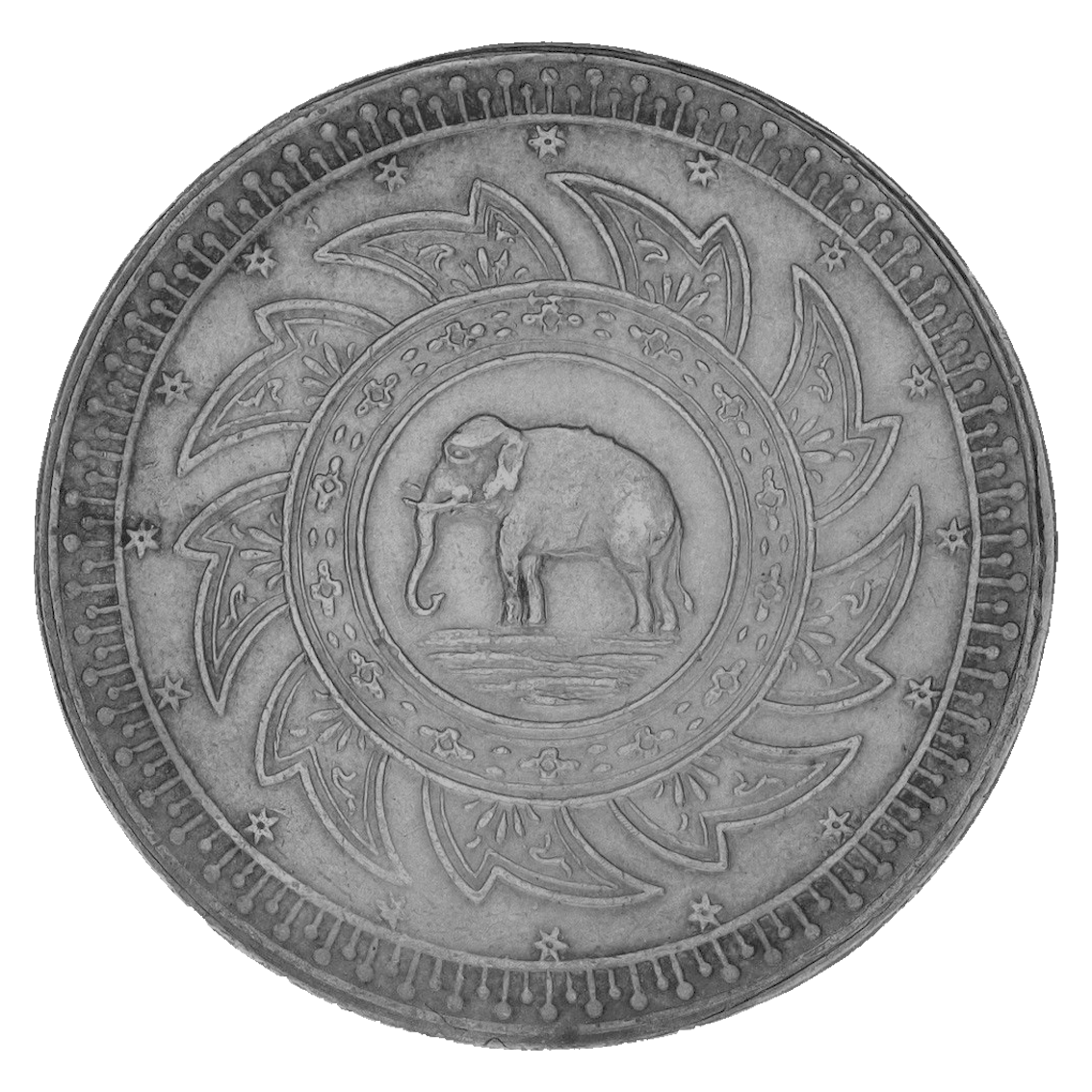
- Design date: 1863

The half-tamlueng (Thai: กึ่งตำลึง) was a historic Thai currency unit used during the pre-decimal era of the Thai baht. One half-tamueng was equal to 2 baht, making it one of the biggest denominations in the traditional Thai monetary system.

1877 series was only made in design, but was never released to the public.

Evolution of half-tamlueng

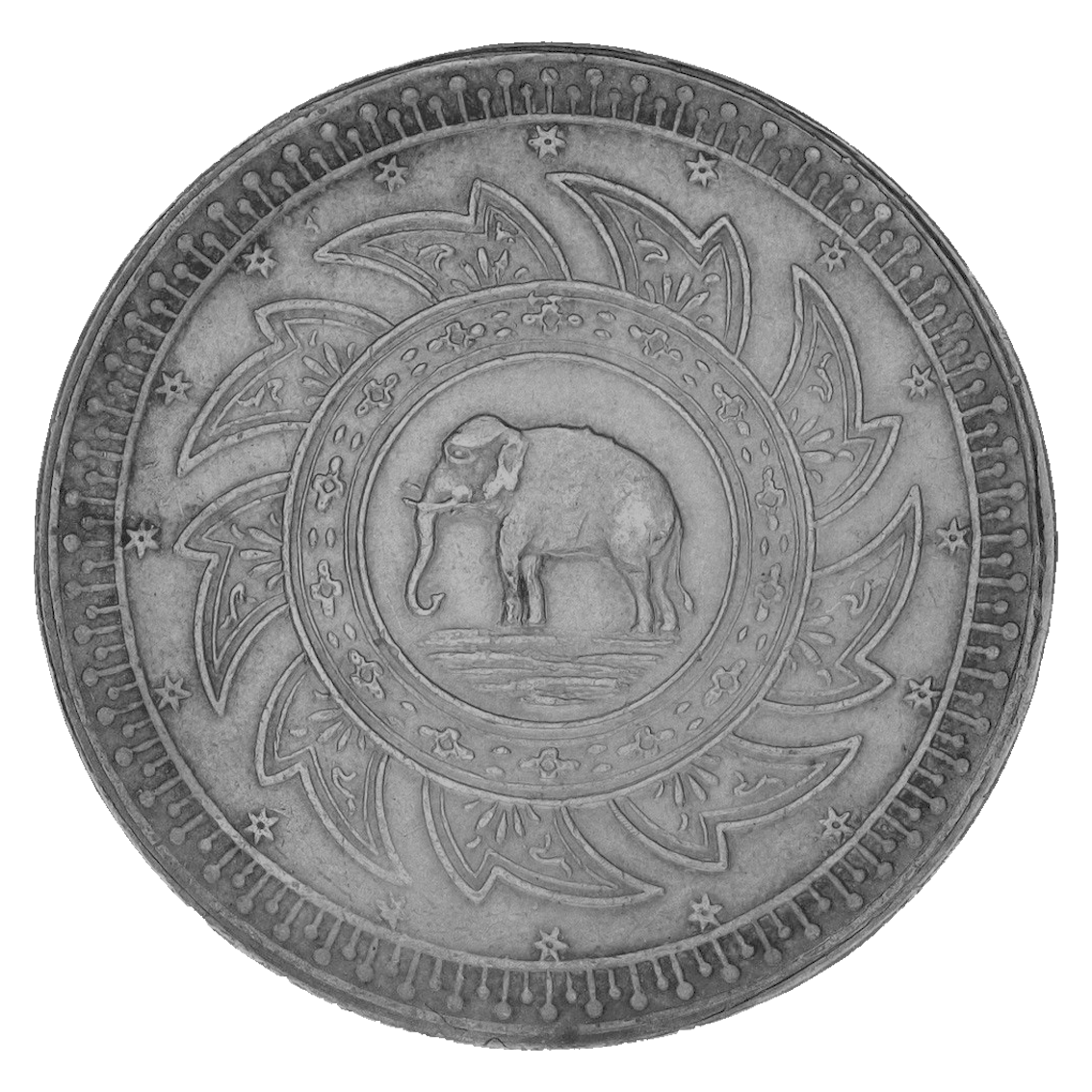
1862

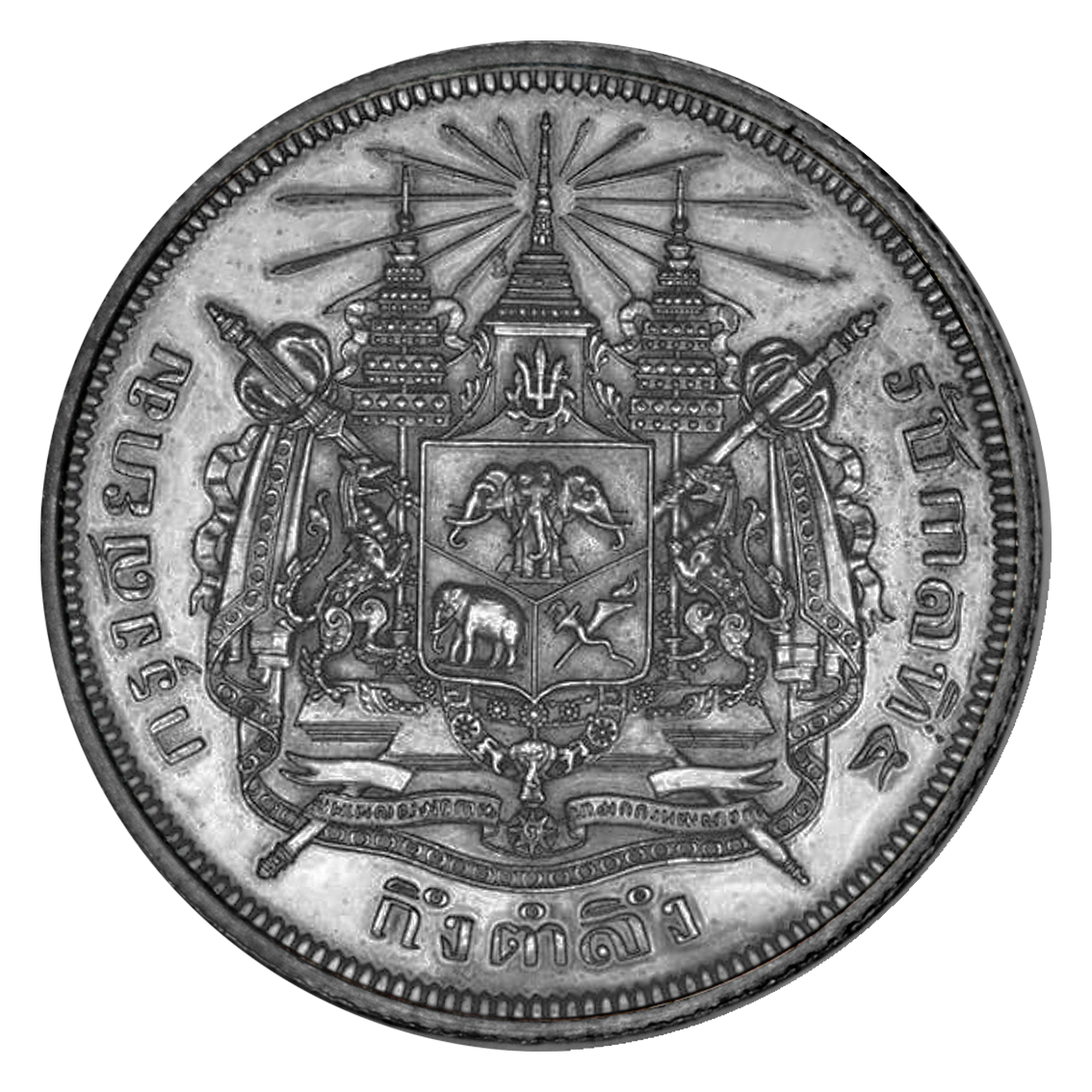
1877

== See also ==
- Thai baht
