= One-tamlueng coin =

Denomination of the Thai baht

1 tamlueng
- Thailand
- Value: 4 Thai baht
- Mass: (1864) 60.4 g
- Diameter: (1864) 45.0 mm
- Edge: Reeded
- Composition: (1864) silver
- Years of minting: 1864

Obverse
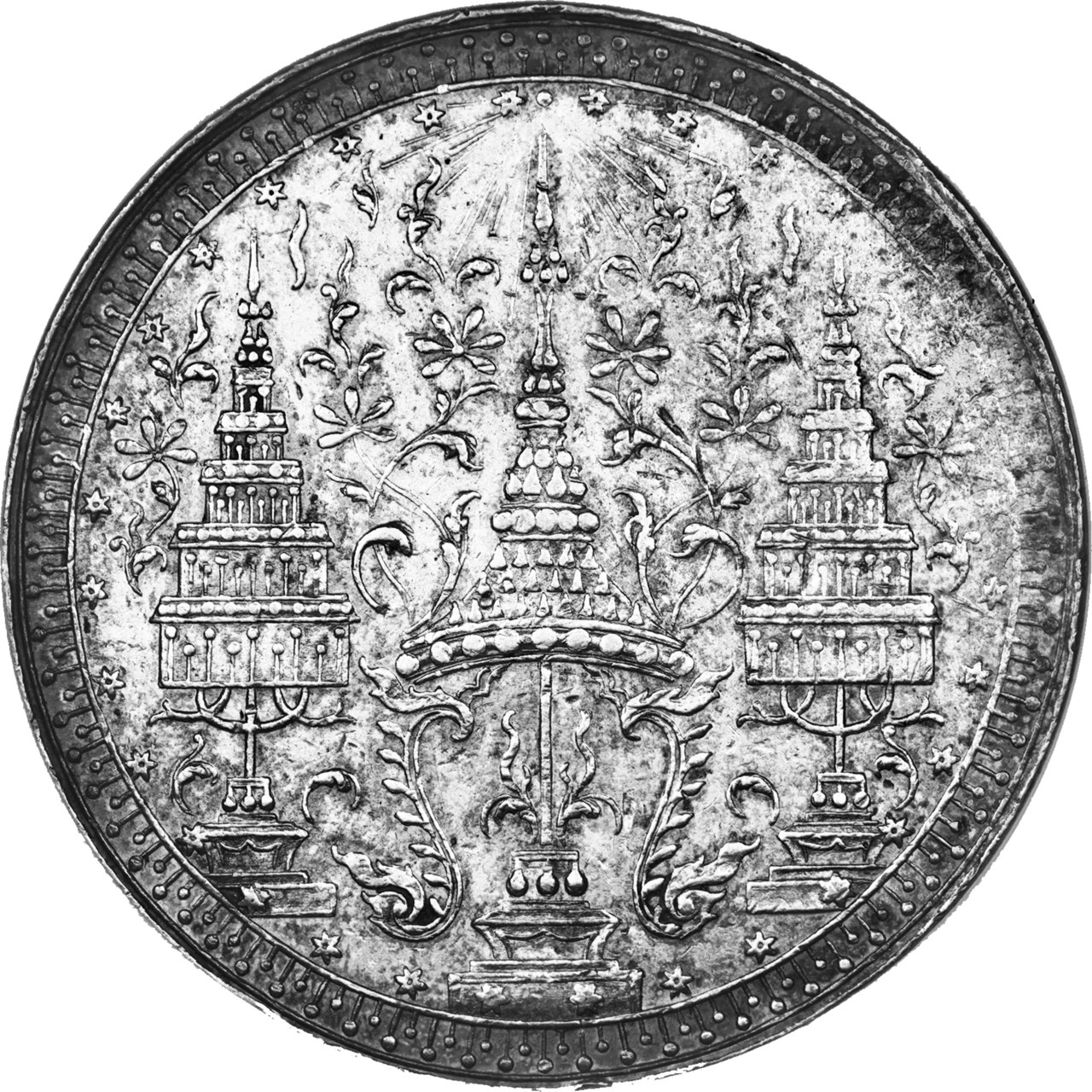
- Design date: 1863

Reverse
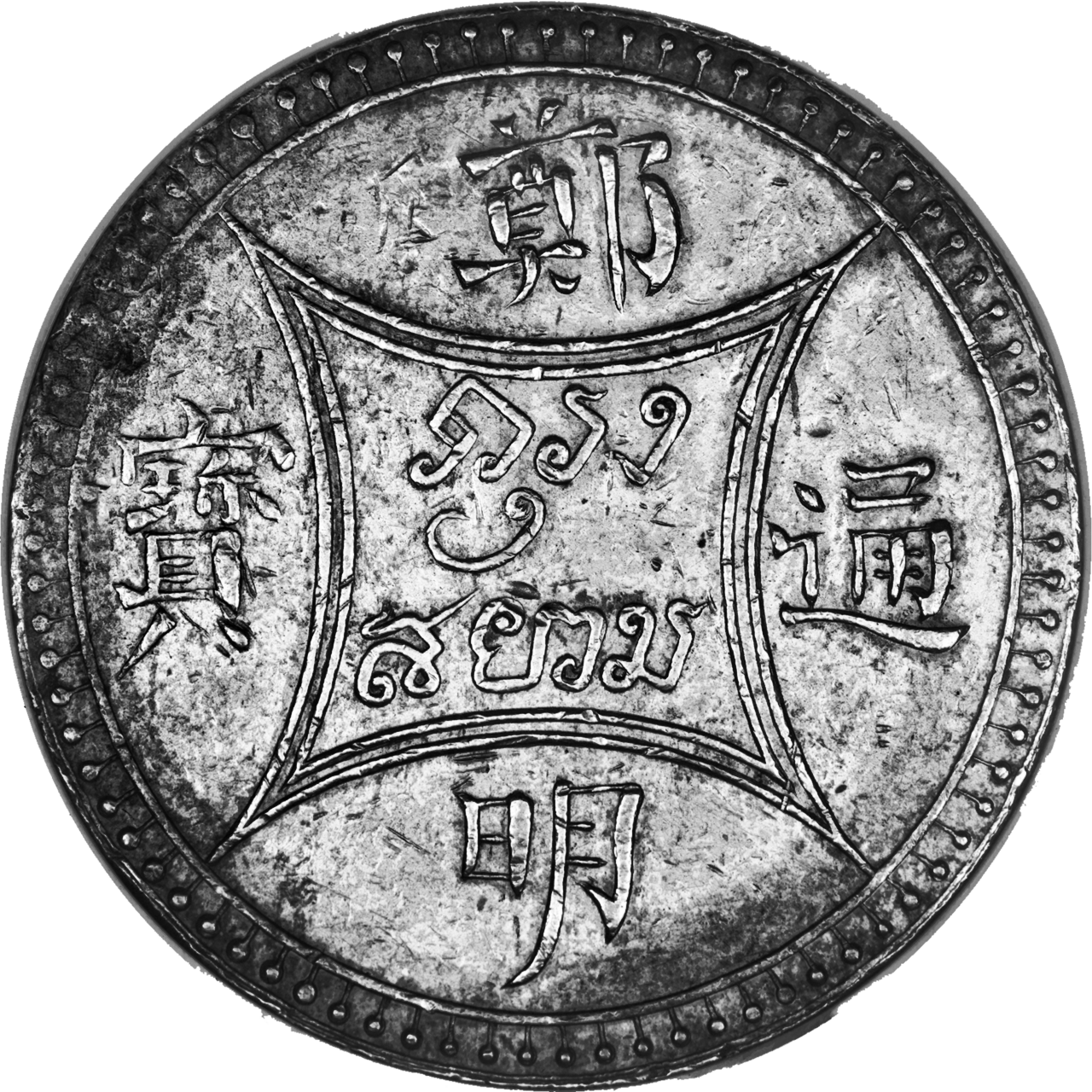
- Design date: 1863

The tamlueng (Thai: ตำลึง) was a historic Thai currency unit used during the pre-decimal era of the Thai baht. One tamueng was equal to 4 baht, making it one of the biggest denominations in the traditional Thai monetary system.

== See also ==
- Thai baht
