= One-paddueng coin =

Denomination of the Thai baht

1 paddueng
- Thailand
- Value: 2½ Thai baht
- Mass: (1863) 2.20 g (1894) 1.73 g
- Diameter: (1863 & 1894) 15.0 mm
- Edge: Reeded
- Composition: (1863 & 1894) gold
- Years of minting: 1863 & 1894

Obverse
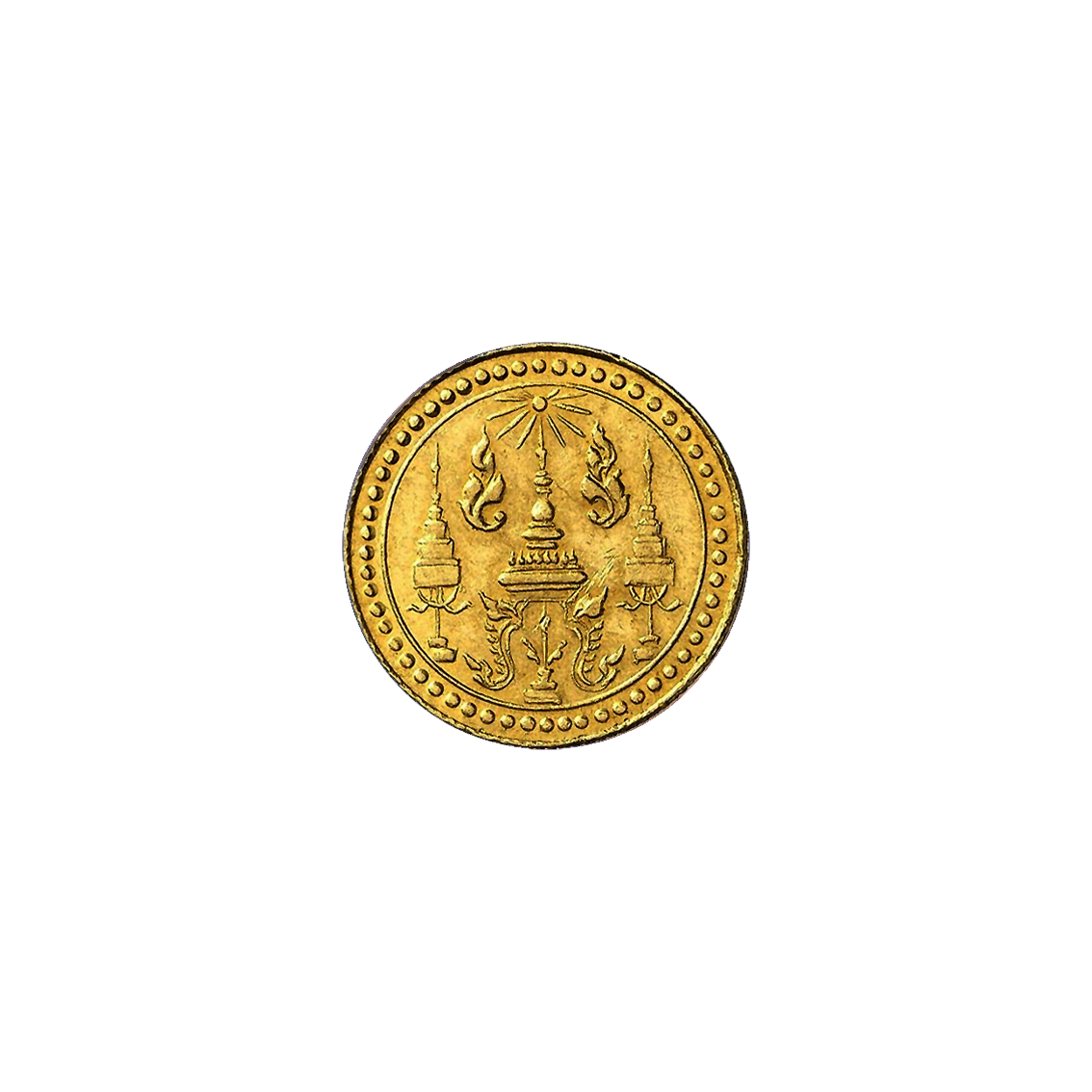
- Design date: 1863 & 1894

Reverse
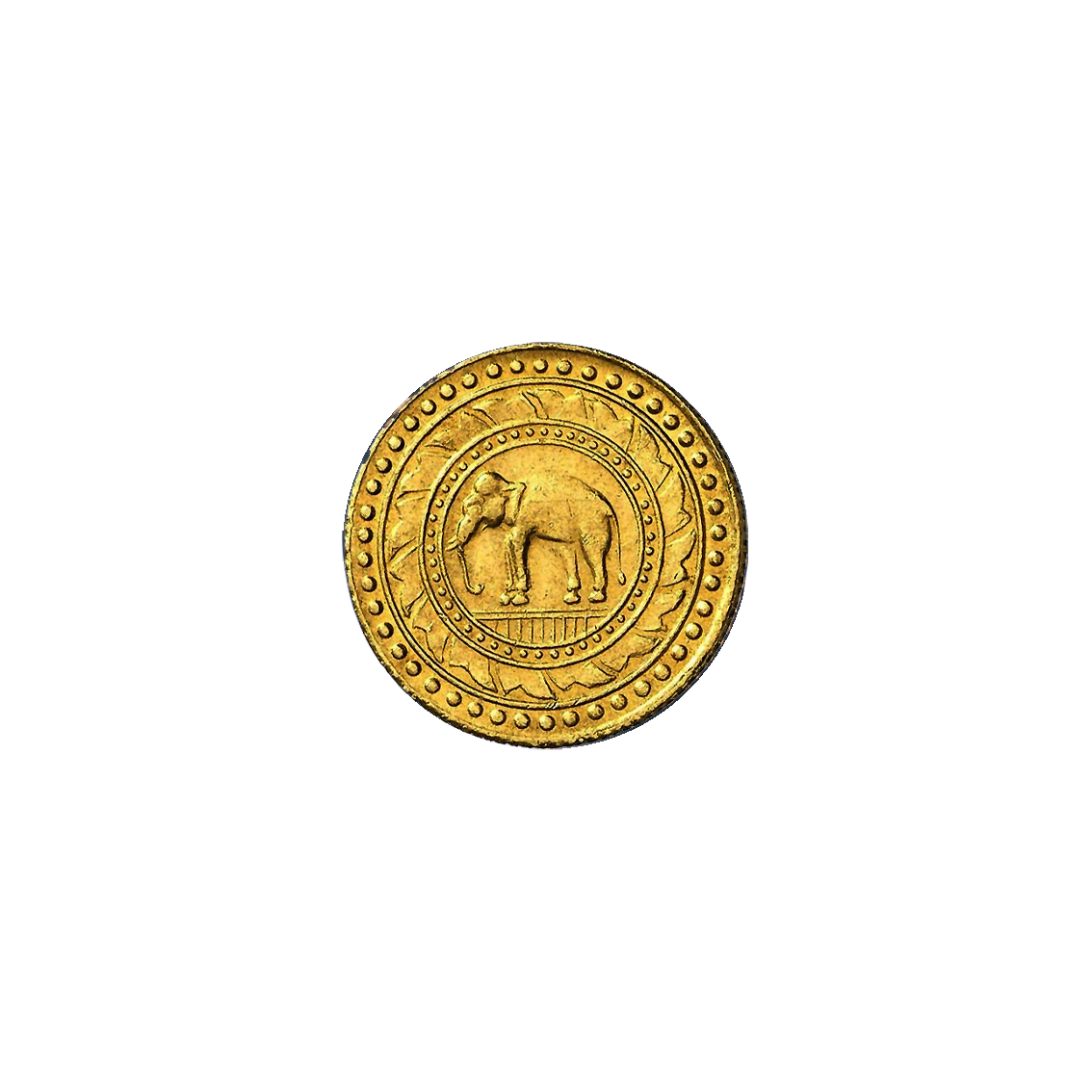
- Design date: 1863 & 1894

The paddueng (Thai: พัดดึงส์) was a historic Thai currency unit used during the pre-decimal era of the Thai baht. One paddueng was equal to 2½ baht, making it one of the biggest denominations in the traditional Thai monetary system.

== See also ==
- Thai baht
