= One-tot coin =

Denomination of the Thai baht

1 tot
- Thailand
- Value: 8 Thai baht
- Mass: (1863) 7.42 g (1894) 7.62 g
- Diameter: (1863 & 1894) 22.0 mm
- Edge: Reeded
- Composition: (1863 & 1894) gold
- Years of minting: 1863 & 1894

Obverse
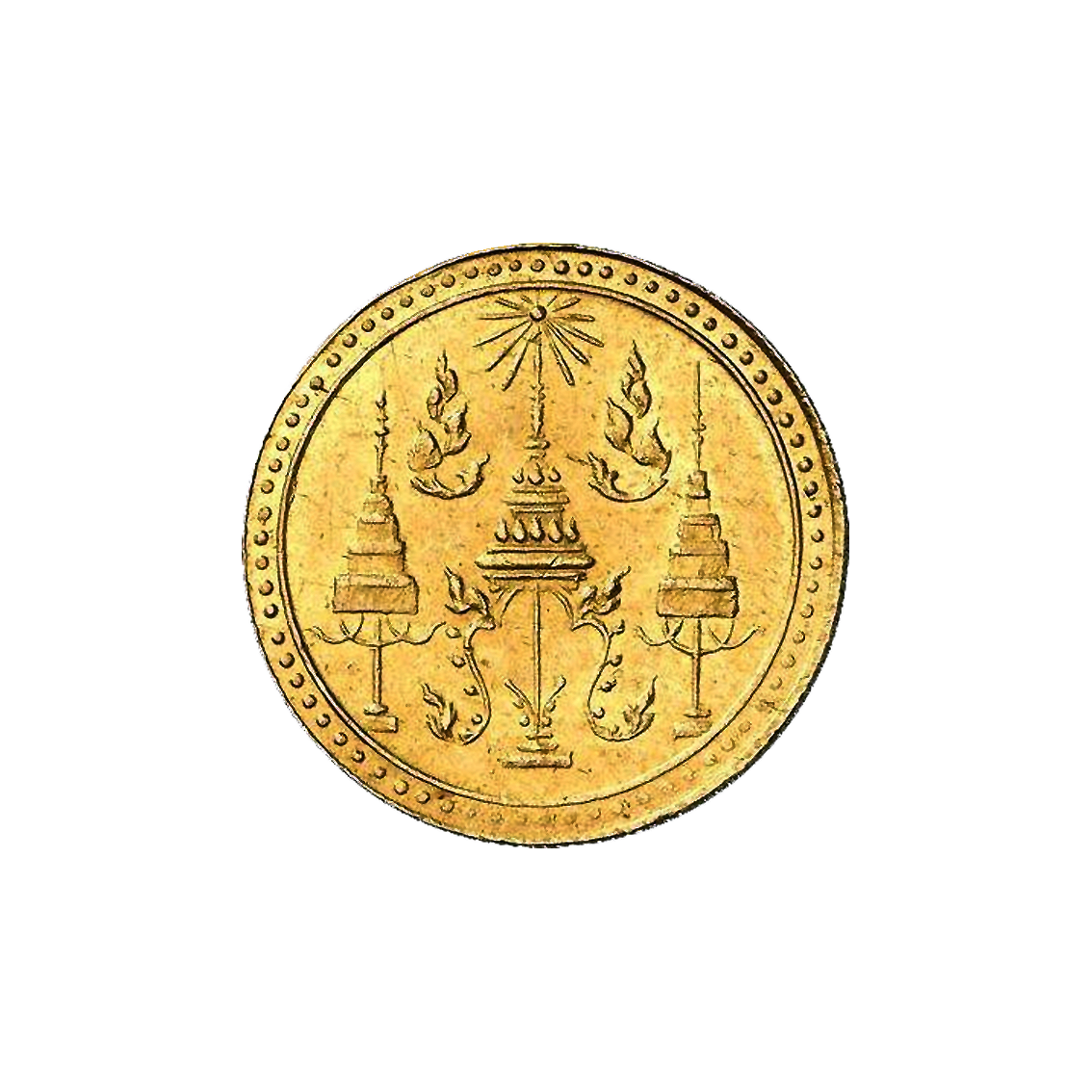
- Design date: 1863 & 1894

Reverse
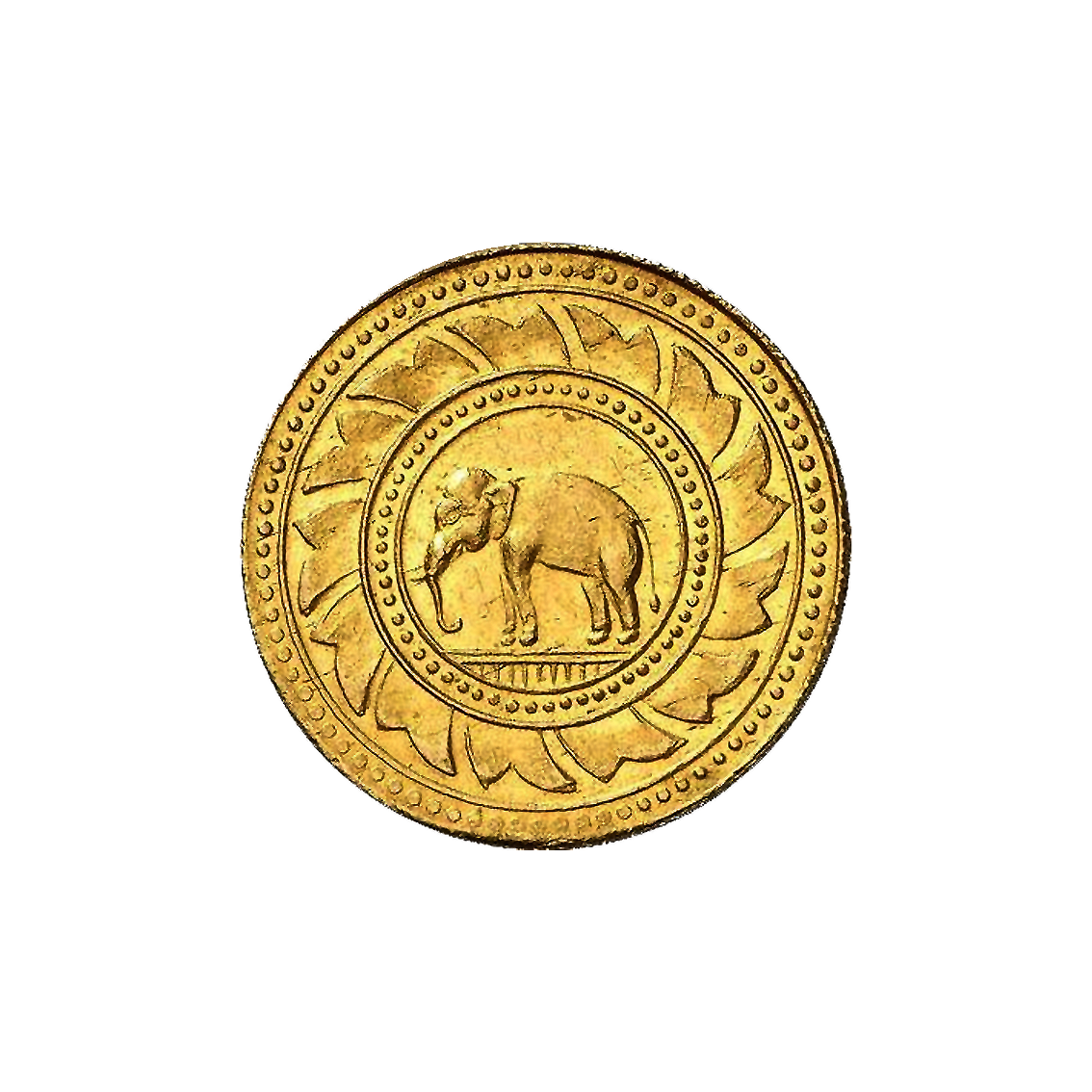
- Design date: 1863 & 1894

The tot (Thai: ทศ) was a historic Thai currency unit used during the pre-decimal era of the Thai baht. One tot was equal to 8 baht, making it one of the biggest denominations in the traditional Thai monetary system.

== See also ==
- Thai baht
