= One-baht coin =

Denomination of the Thai baht

1 baht
- Thailand
- Value: 1 Thai baht
- Mass: 3.0 g
- Diameter: 20.00 mm
- Thickness: 1 mm
- Edge: Reeded
- Composition: Nickel-plated steel >99% Fe, <1% Ni
- Years of minting: 1860–present
- Catalog number: -

Obverse
- Design: King Vajiralongkorn
- Designer: Vudhichai Seangern
- Design date: 2018

Reverse
- Design: Royal Monogram of King Vajiralongkorn
- Designer: Chaiyod Soontrapa
- Design date: 2018

The one-baht coin is a denomination coin of the Thai baht, the Thai currency unit.

Like all coins in Thailand, its obverse features the King of Thailand, Vajiralongkorn, and previously Bhumibol Adulyadej. The newest set of coins features King Vajiralongkorn's royal monogram on the reverse side while the coins of the previous set featured Wat Phra Sri Rattana Satsadaram or Wat Phra Kaew, the royal temple in Bangkok's Grand Palace complex.

It is commonly called rian baht (Thai:เหรียญบาท) by Thai speakers (rian meaning "coin" in Thai).

== Series ==
1 baht coin designs over time

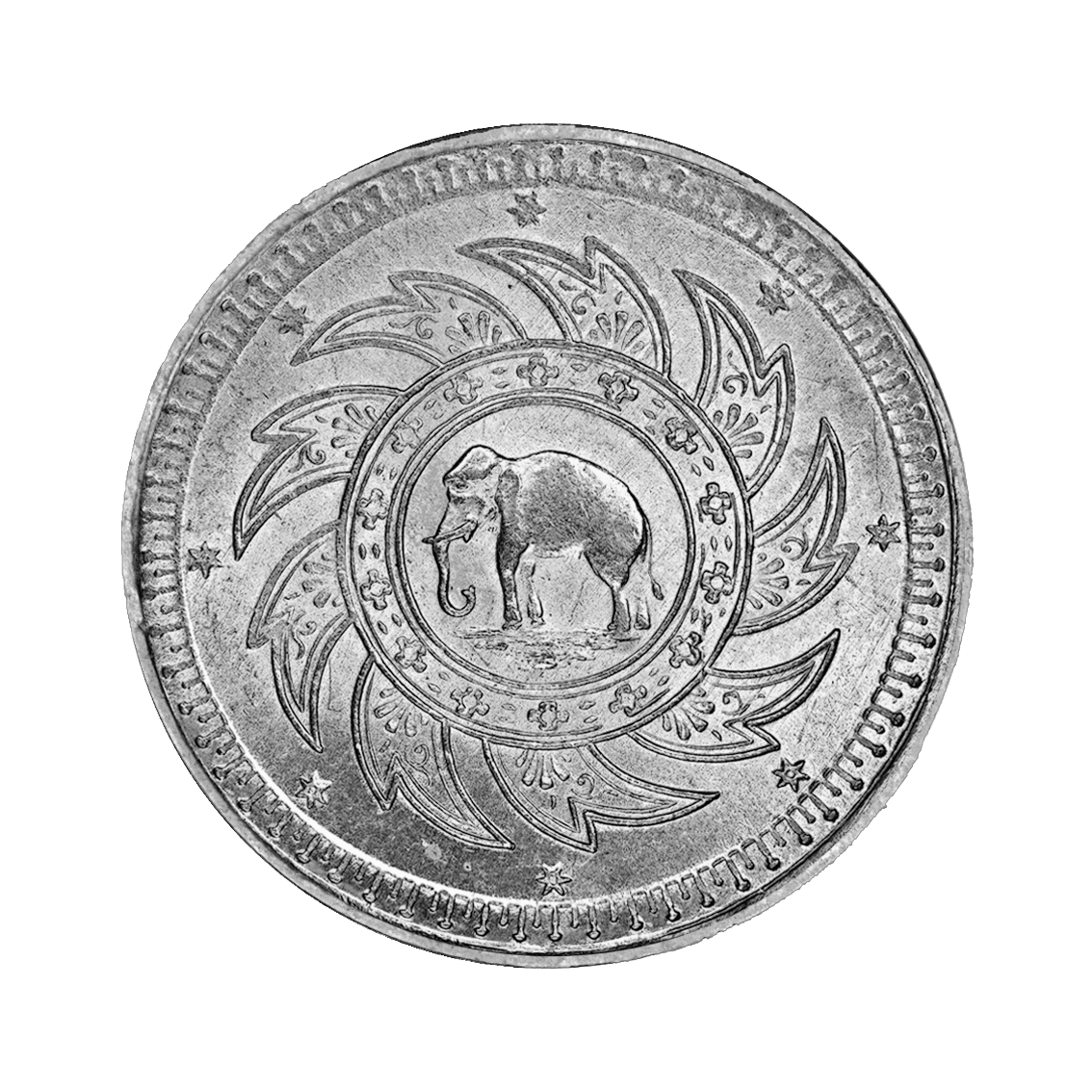
1862

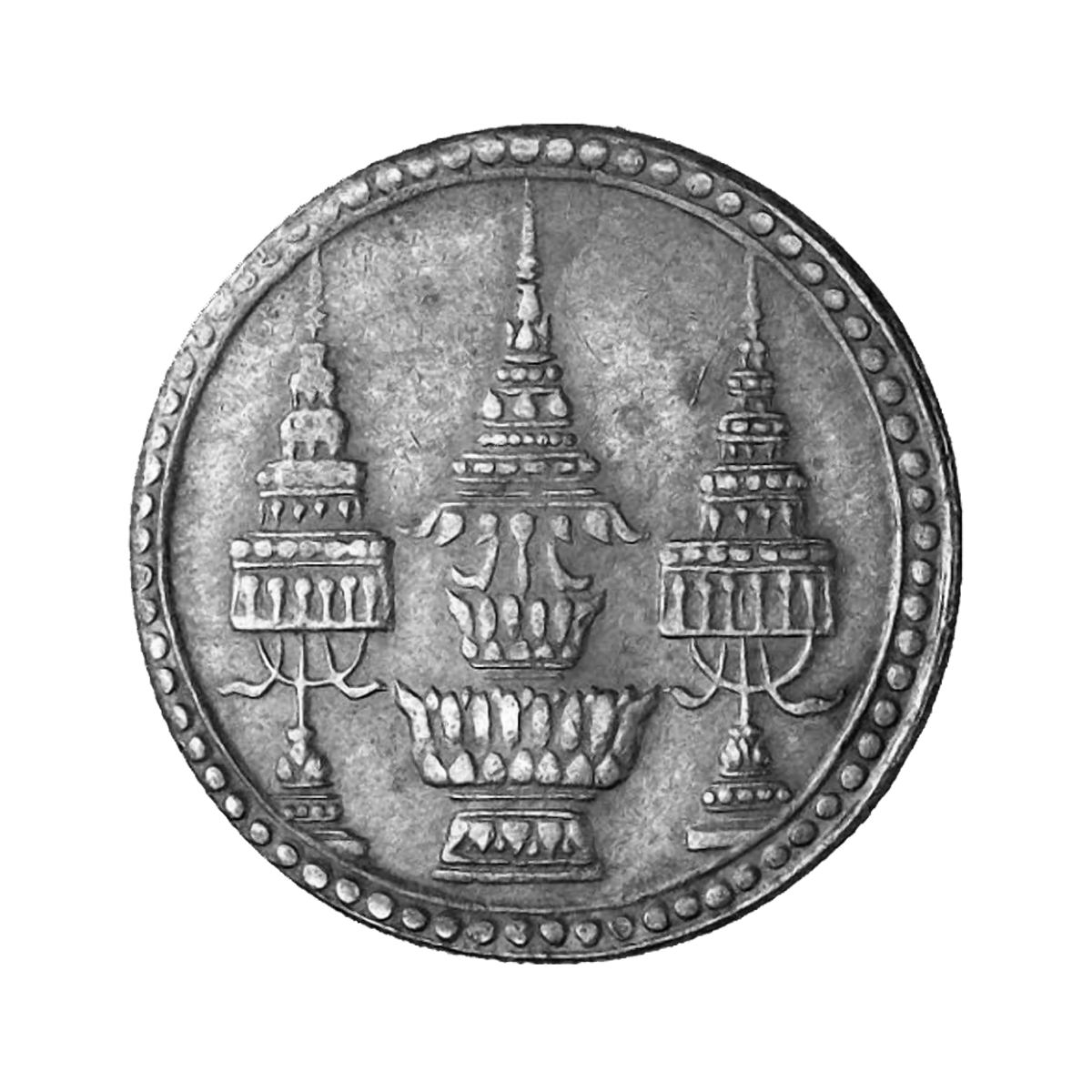
1869

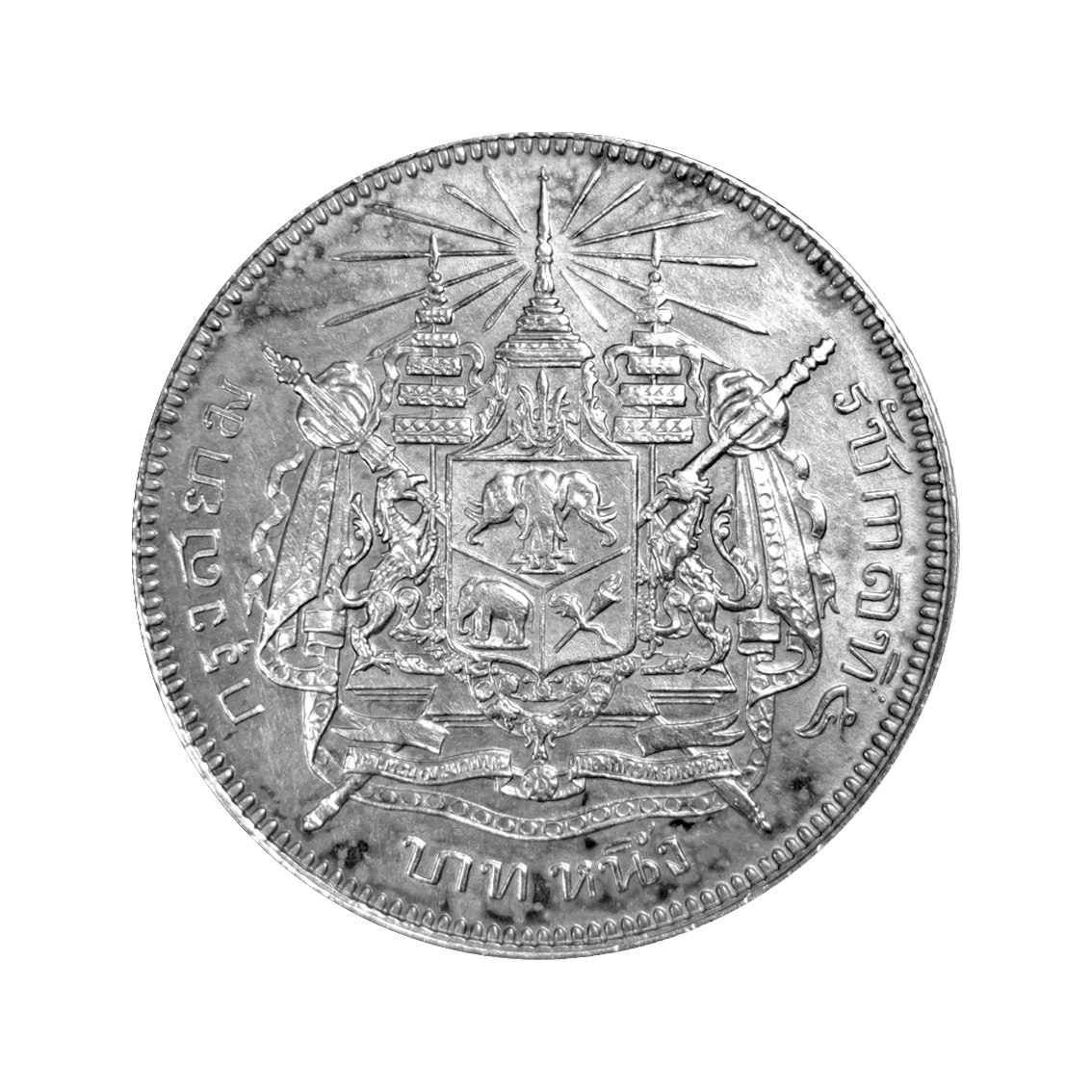
1876

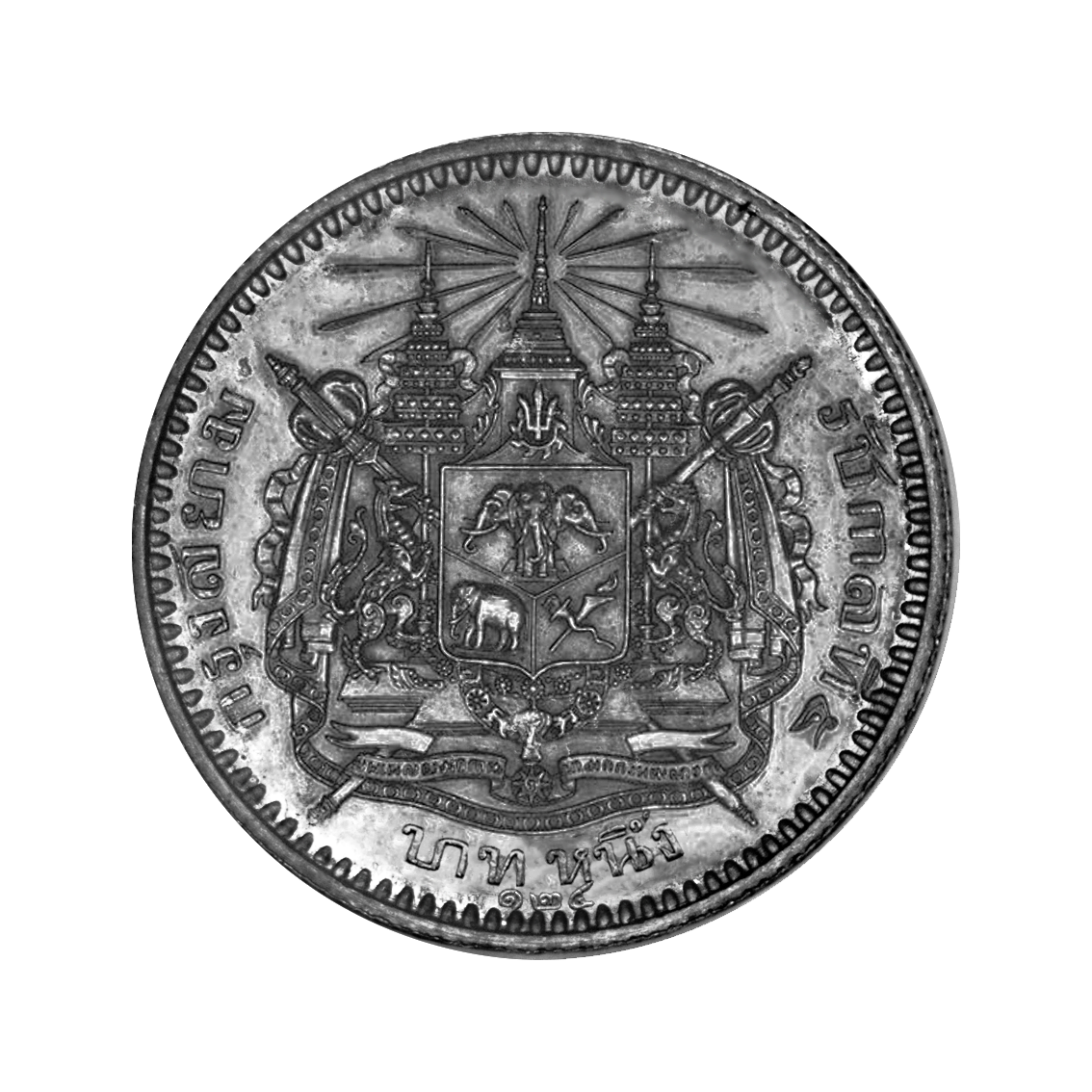
1901

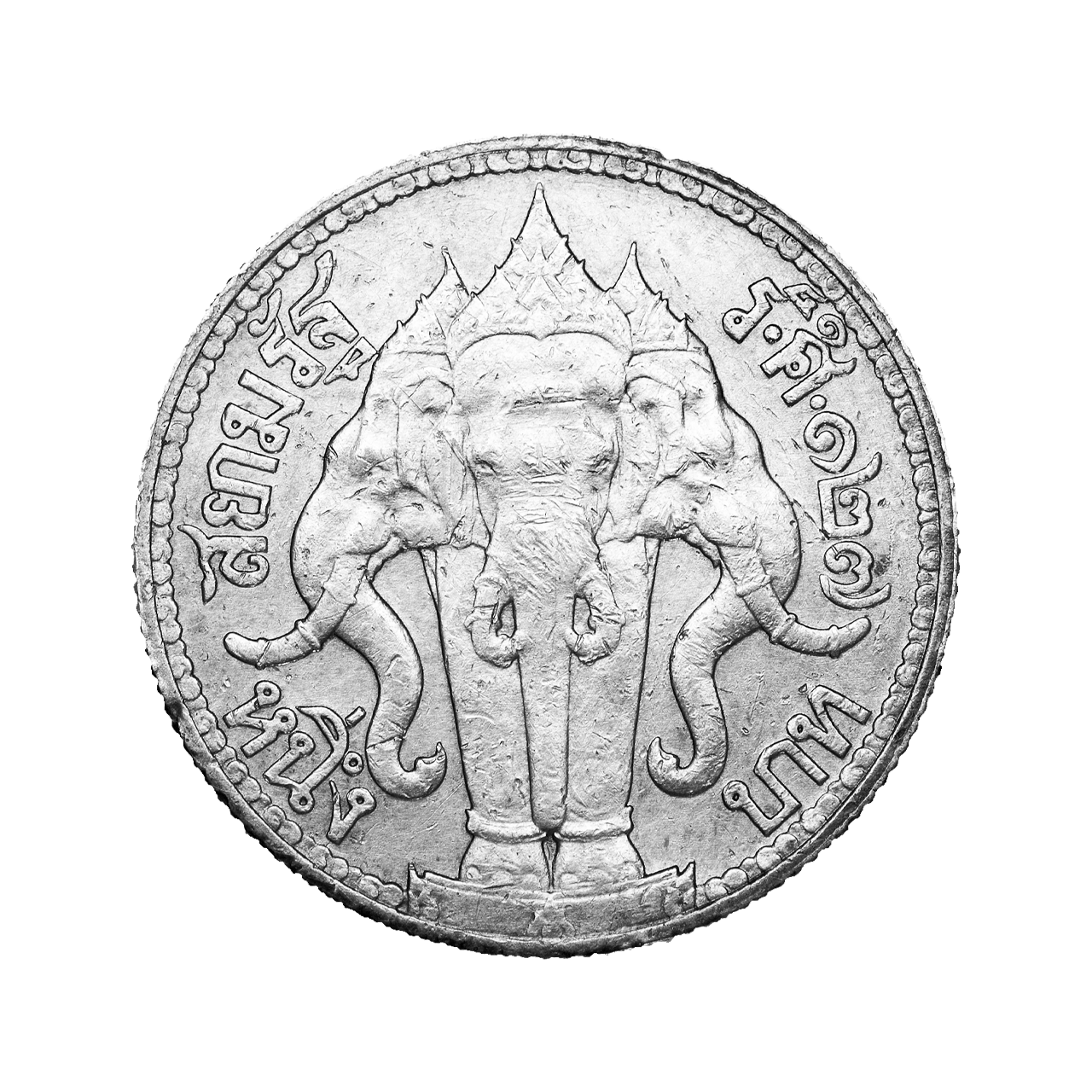
1908

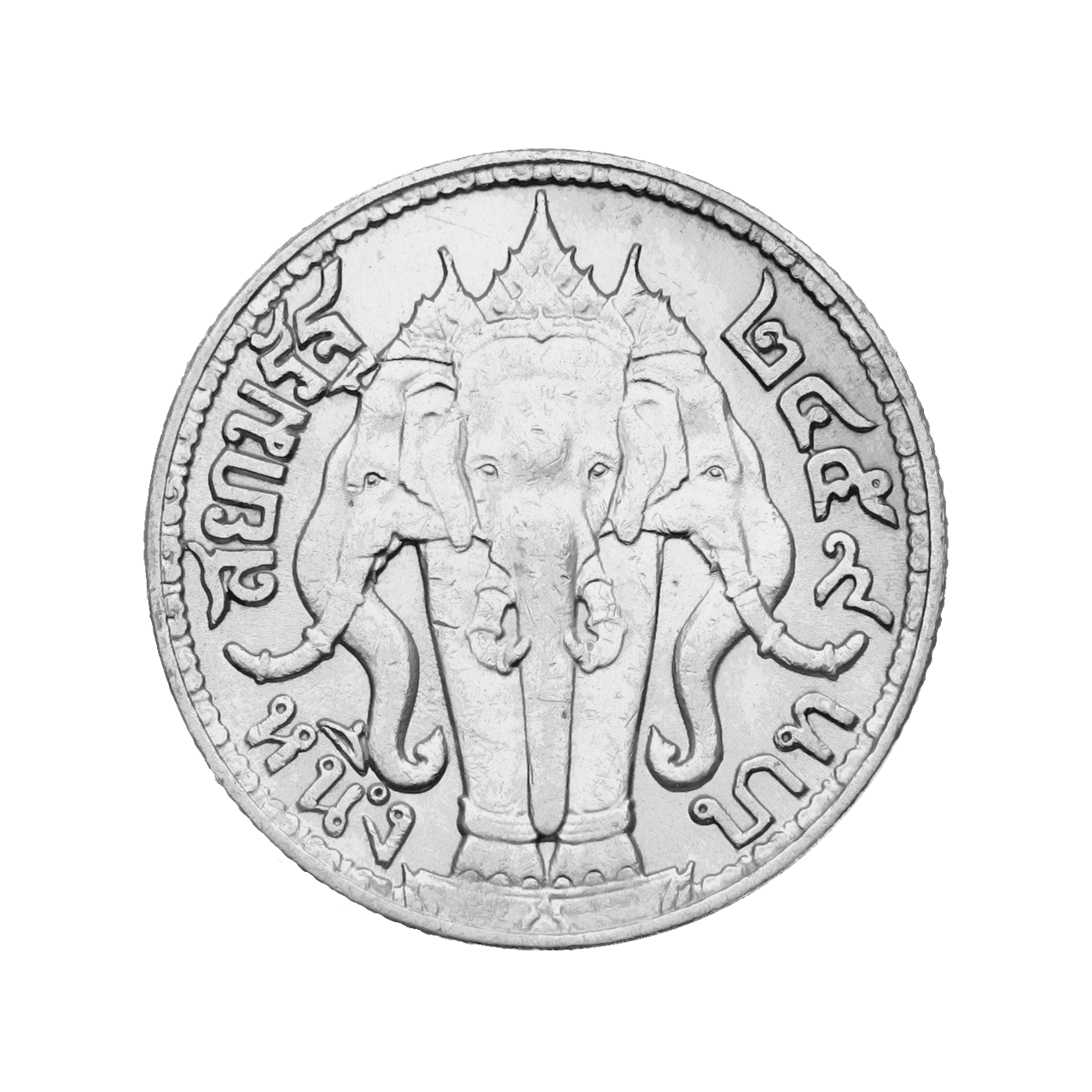
1913

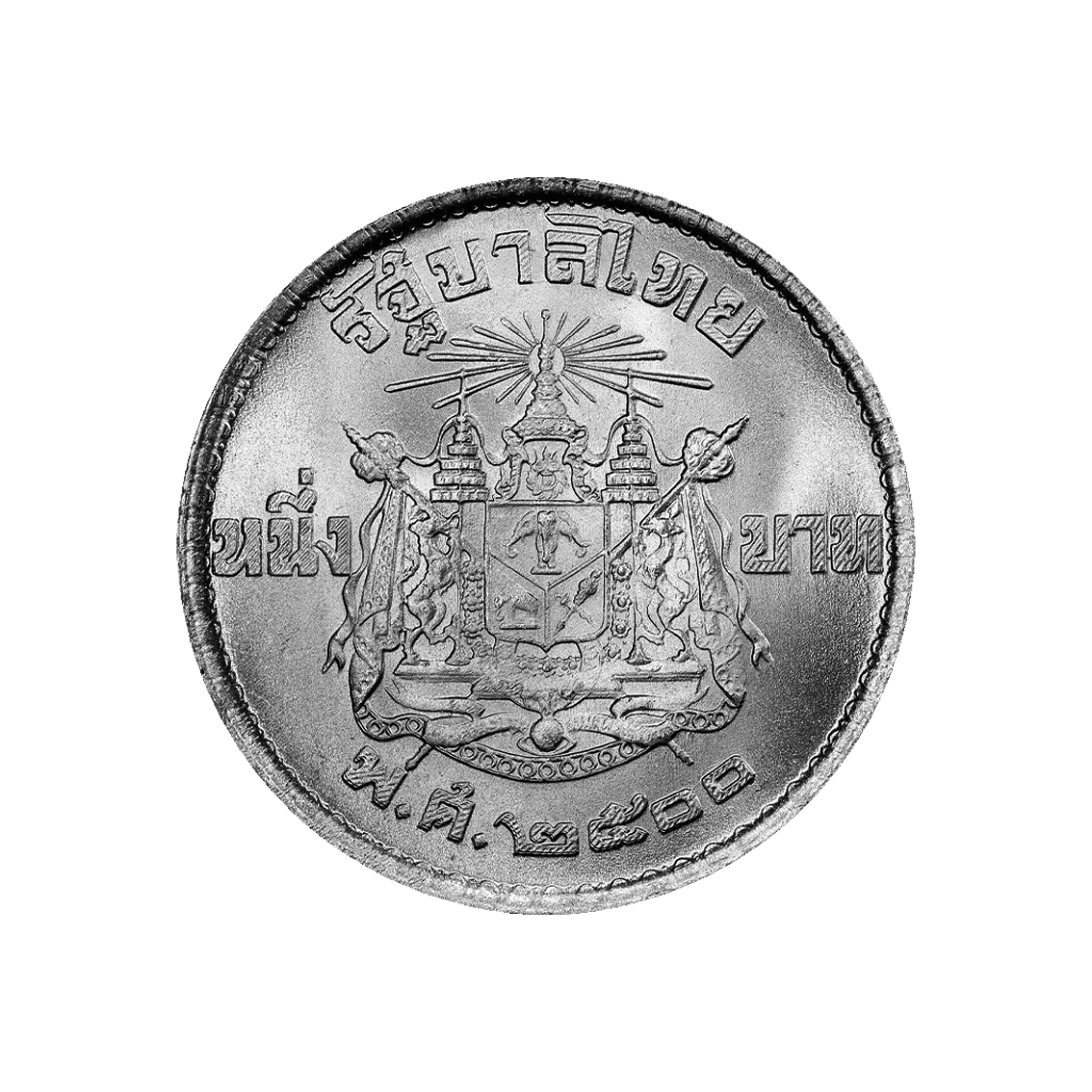
1957

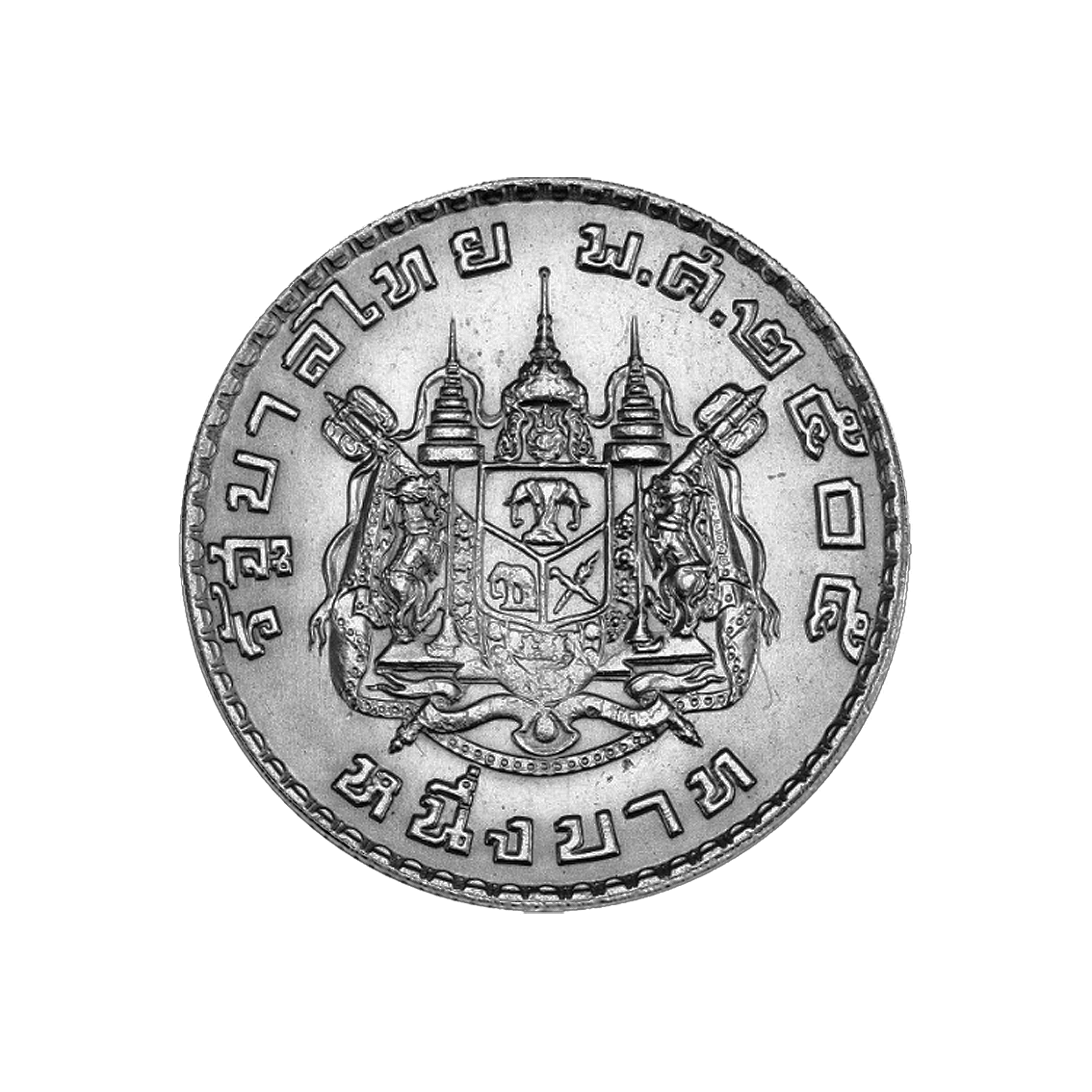
1962

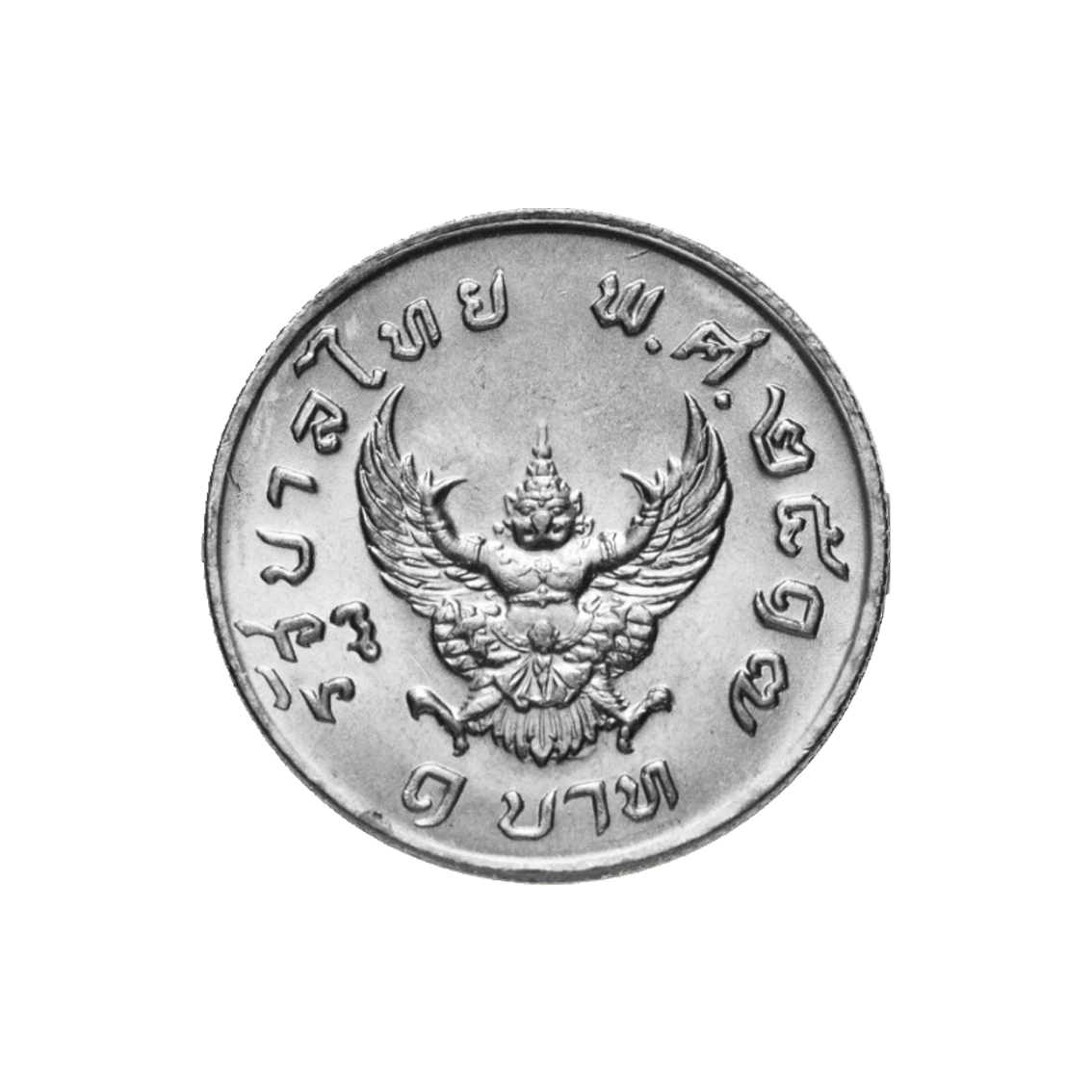
1972

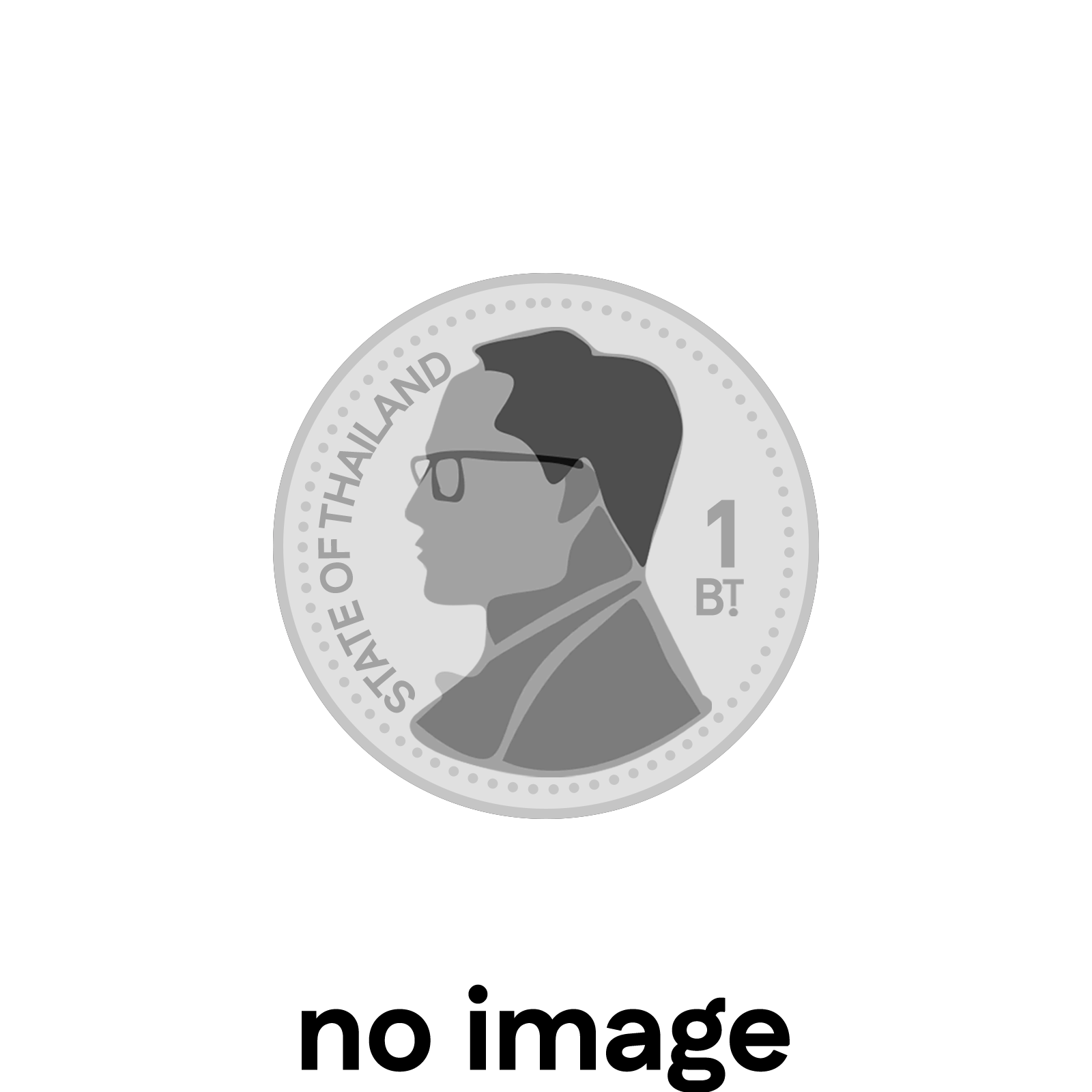
1987

=== 2009 changes ===
On February 2, 2009, the Treasury Department announced changes to several circulating coins. The composition of the one-baht coin changed from cupronickel to nickel-clad iron, reducing the mass from 3.4 grams to 3.0 grams. The obverse image has also been updated to a more recent portrait of the king.

=== 2018 series ===
The Ministry of Finance announced on March 28, 2018 that the first coins featuring the portrait of His Majesty King Maha Vajiralongkorn Bodindradebayavarangkun will be put in circulation on April 6.

== History ==
=== 1855-1869, Gift from queen Victoria ===
During the reign of King Rama IV, also known as Mongkut, Siam undertook significant monetary reforms. To familiarize the population with “flat” coins and to compensate for the limited supply of traditional bullet money, cowrie shells, South American reais, and various regional currencies then in circulation, the government introduced in 1856 a series of transitional silver and gold coins produced by manual striking.

In 1857, Queen Victoria of the United Kingdom presented King Mongkut with a small hand-operated coining press. The coins struck using this device became known as Rien Bannakarn (“Royal Gift Coins”). Due to the low production capacity of the manual press, minting soon ceased. However, Siam continued its efforts to establish a modern mint and subsequently acquired a steam-powered coining press from England. To house the new equipment, King Mongkut ordered the construction of the Sitticarn Mint within the palace grounds. The first coins produced on the new press utilized the dies of the Royal Gift Coins. These issues circulated alongside traditional sweat duang bullet coins, whose minting had been discontinued. Bullet coins were gradually withdrawn, melted down, and reused as metal for later flat-coin issues. A small number of sweat duang pieces were later struck by the next monarch as commemorative issues in memory of deceased relatives.

Also in 1857, the government officially recognized exchange rates for certain foreign currencies that were already widely used in trade: 1 baht was set equal to 0.6 Straits dollars, and 5 baht to 7 Indian rupees.

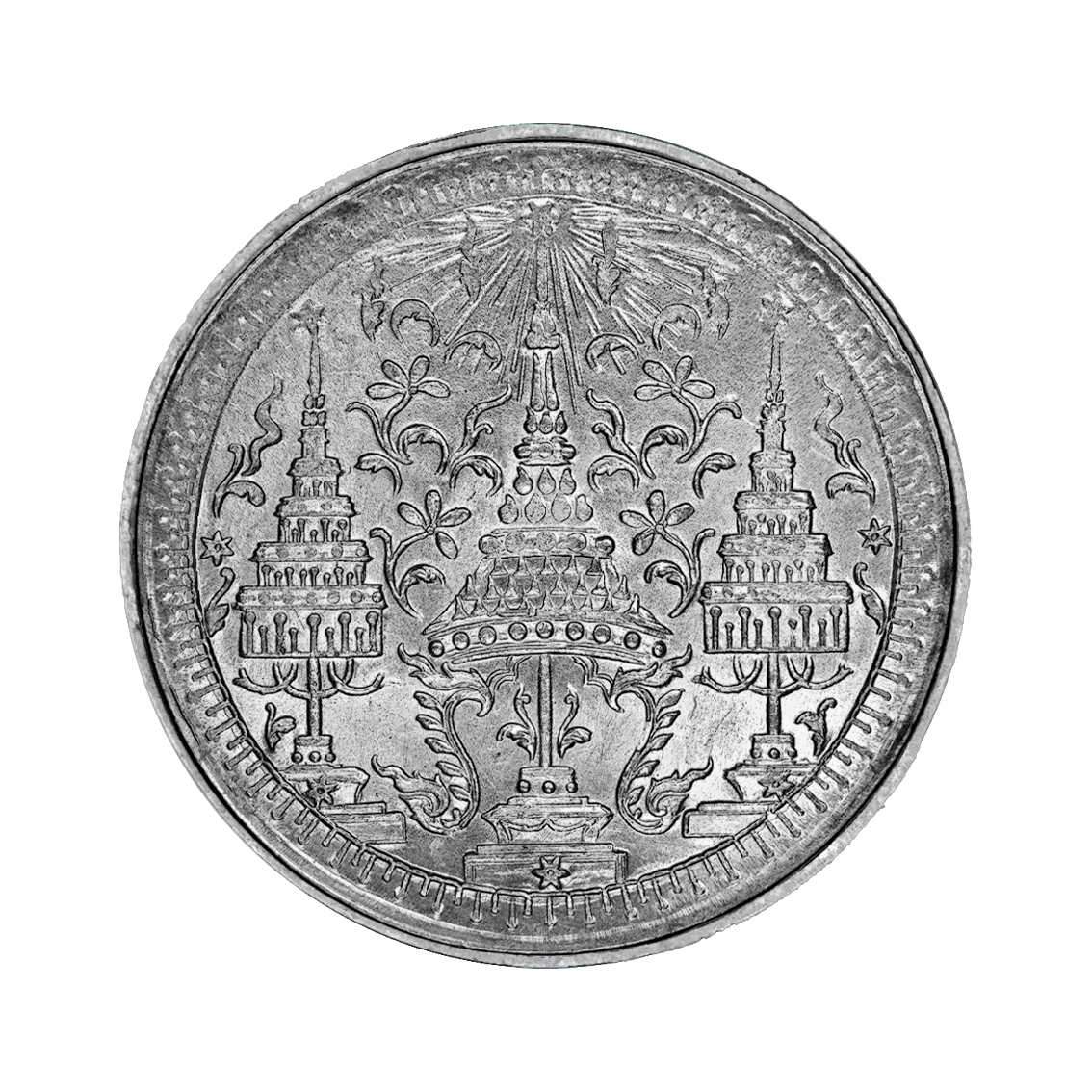
1857/1860 2nd issue, 1 baht

The first machine-struck flat coins of Siam were released in 1860. This initial series comprised seven silver denominations: 1 sik, 1 fuang, 1 and 2 salung, and 1, 2, and 4 baht. Additional denominations followed, including tin 1 solot and 1 att coins in 1862, copper 2 and 4 att in 1865, and gold 2½, 4, and 8 baht coins in 1863. Many of these coins were struck at the Birmingham Mint and became popularly known as Rien. The word Rien is derived from real, a trading currency similar to the newly introduced coins.

A total of 2,400 one-baht Bannakarn coins were struck. They circulated concurrently with the later one-baht coins of 1860, which were produced in far greater numbers on the new steam-powered minting press ordered from England. Because the differences between the Bannakarn pieces and the 1860 one-baht coins were not widely recognized, both types remained in circulation together. When these issues were eventually withdrawn and melted, the Bannakarn coins were destroyed along with the rest, making surviving examples rare.

According to curator’s comments recorded in 1994, the “Royal Gift” coins were presented to the British Museum in 1857 by the Earl of Clarendon. The notes outline the historical context of minting reforms during the reign of King Mongkut (1851–1868), a period marked by the opening of Siam to international trade and the transition from traditional bullet-shaped currency to machine-struck flat coinage.

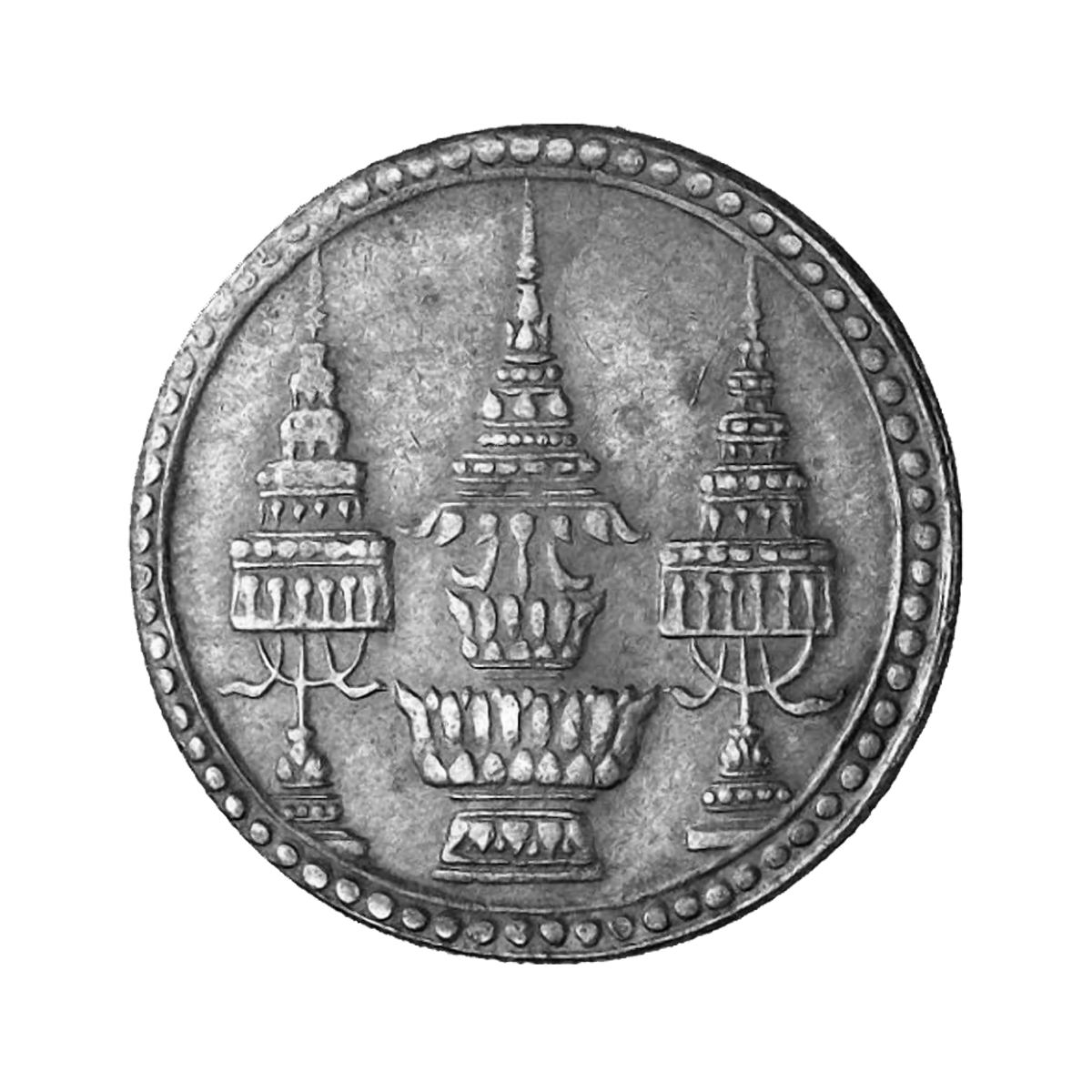
1869 3rd issue, 1 baht

In 1856, enquiries were made in Britain about the cost of supplying modern minting equipment to Siam. Correspondence between King Mongkut and Sir Robert Schomburgk, the British Consul, indicates that by February 1859 there was an acute shortage of silver bullet money, prompting the King to seek a press capable of producing 100,000 ticals per day. In March 1858 Schomburgk was instructed to procure a minting machine costing £2,000, along with two engineers to operate it. By this time, however, Queen Victoria had already gifted a small coining press to the King—adequate for experimental purposes but insufficient for large-scale production.

Schomburgk subsequently discovered that Siamese envoys had independently ordered a complete minting system from the British firm Taylor of Birmingham, the same manufacturer that had produced the Queen’s gift press. Their order, costing £3,000, was fulfilled, and the machinery arrived in Bangkok in 1858–1859. It was installed within the Grand Palace, and the official edict announcing the issuance of the new flat silver ticals was dated 17 September 1860.

Throughout this era, Siam lacked a modern institutional framework to regulate its money supply. The Treasury operated primarily as a passive intermediary: When silver entered the country through trade, merchants sold it to the Treasury and received baht coins and when silver was required for the payment of imports, baht coins were exchanged back for silver bullion.

Thus, the money supply fluctuated according to trade flows rather than formal monetary policy. The absence of regulatory tools meant that Siam’s monetary system was highly sensitive to global market developments, especially those affecting silver prices.

=== 1869-1876, Transition ===
The designed slightly changed on the obverse where the Rama IV's seal used to be there, the coin was updated to contain Rama V's seal.

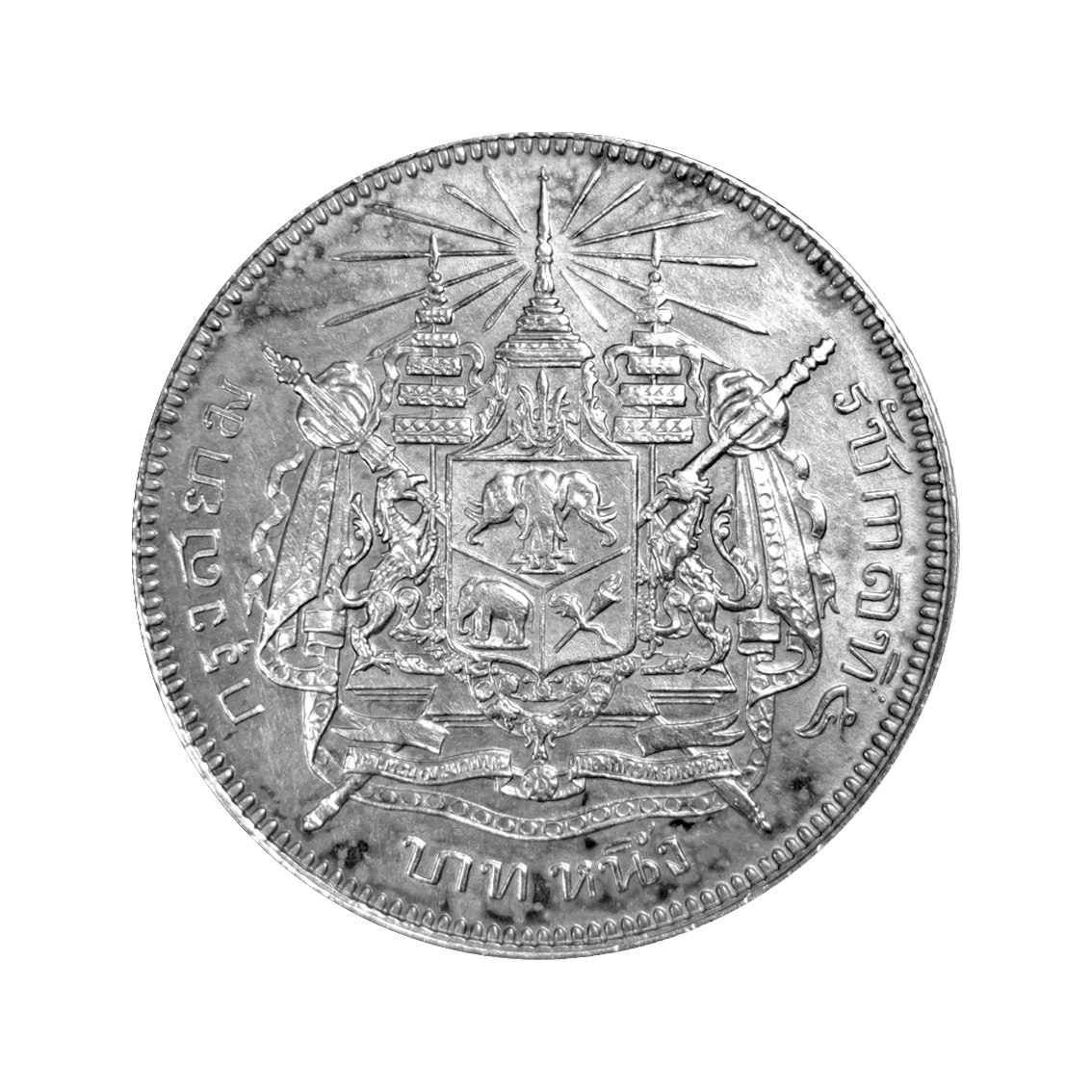
1876 4th issue, 1 baht

=== 1876-1909, Phasing out podduangs ===
During this era, podduangs and flat-coins co-circulate. The finess during this era was being standardized to 0.900 or 0.925 depending on where the coin is being minted. Prior to this, the standard floated around 0.900 to 0.960. Under the silver standard, the value of the baht depended on the amount of silver it contained. Official specifications placed the baht at approximately 15.292 grams, of which about 90.625% was silver. As Siam’s trade expanded during the second half of the nineteenth century, the nation experienced a net inflow of silver because its exports consistently exceeded imports. This silver was sold to the Royal Treasury, which returned newly minted baht coins in exchange. The process led to a gradual but continuous increase in the domestic money supply.

After 1870, global silver prices began to fall as silver depreciated relative to gold on world markets. For Siam, the decline raised the domestic cost of imports—many of which had to be paid for in gold-standard currencies such as sterling—while simultaneously encouraging exports. Concern over the rising cost of essential imports and the burden of servicing foreign loans denominated in sterling contributed to growing sentiment within the government to end reliance on the silver standard. In 1902, Siam formally abandoned silver convertibility, an important step toward a stabilized and modernized monetary system. Thus, abandoning the bi-metallic system. Podduang gradually became less circulated due to the massive production of flat-coins, and was formally phased out by 1900.

The designs also started including dates since 1901

=== 1893-1910, Decimalization ===
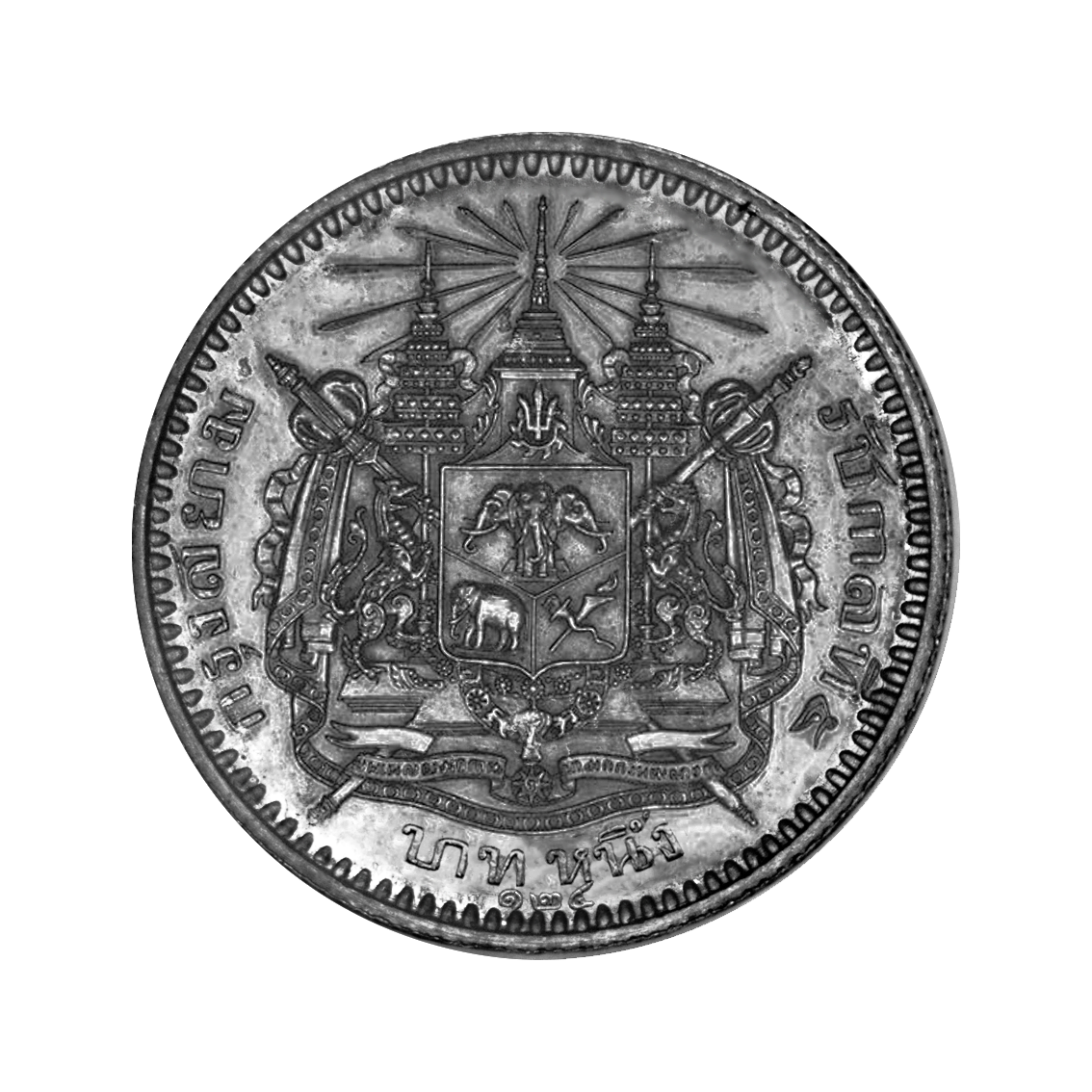
1876 4th issue, 2nd variation 1 baht

The reign of King Chulalongkorn (Rama V) saw major transformations in Siam’s monetary and fiscal systems, culminating in the adoption of a decimal currency structure. On 21 August 1898, the Siamese government formally announced its intention to transition from the traditional multi-denominational system, formerly comprising thirteen interrelated units, to a simplified decimal system modeled on Western standards. The principal architect of this reform was Prince Jayanta Mongkol (Jayanta Mongkol, Prince Mahisara Rajaharudaya), a half-brother of the king and Minister of Finance from 1896 to 1906, later celebrated as the “father of Thai banking.” Under the new system, the baht (or tical/tikal)—a silver coin of approximately 15.033 g with .900 fineness—was divided into 100 satang, the term satang (สตางค์) being derived from Pali with the meaning “one-hundredth.” The reform also retained the salung (¼ baht) as an intermediate unit, as it aligned naturally with the new decimal structure.

The decimalization prompted the introduction of a new series of copper-nickel coins in denominations of 2½, 5, 10, and 20 satang, representing Siam’s first modern minor coinage. Although the government officially announced the full transition to the decimal system on 25 November 1902, elements of the earlier system persisted for several years: bronze coins based on the old att unit continued to be minted until 1905, and silver baht-based coins remained in production until 1910. Further changes were made in 1908, when Rama V introduced 1, 5, 10, 25, and 50 satang coins .

During 1907–1908, Rama V also commissioned a special issue of 1 baht silver coins from the Paris Mint, engraved by the noted French medalist Henri-Auguste-Jules Patey. These coins, depicting the king in middle age with a distinctive moustache, earned the popular nickname “mustache baht”. Although intended for circulation, they were not released before the king’s death in 1910 and were instead distributed by his successor, King Vajiravudh (Rama VI), at Rama V’s cremation ceremony. Upon ascending the throne, Rama VI retained the existing designs for small denominations, which continued to bear the legend “Kingdom of Siam” (สยามรัฐ), maintaining continuity with the final years of his father’s reign.

Throughout all of this, the old 1876 series 1 baht coin were continuously circulated.

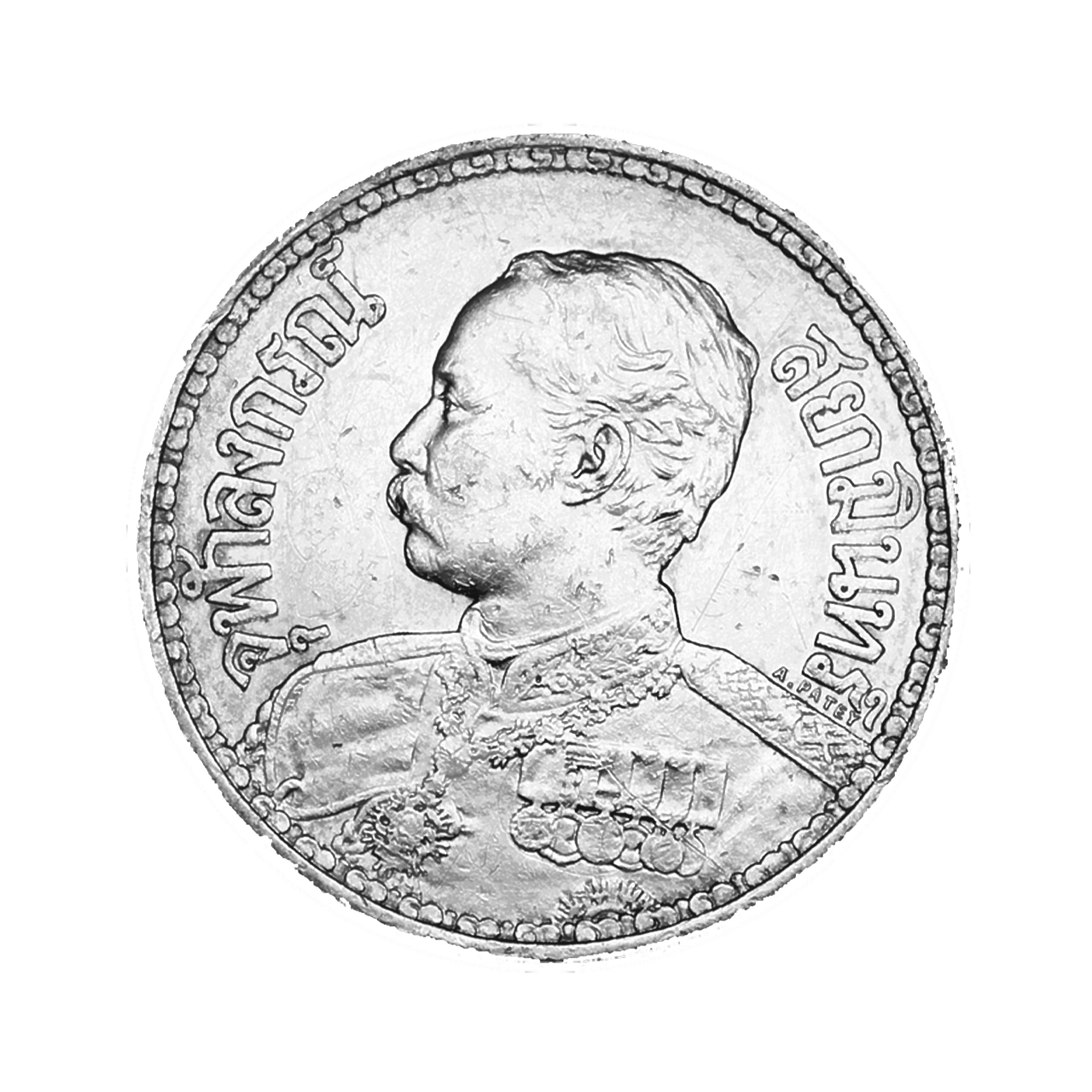
front

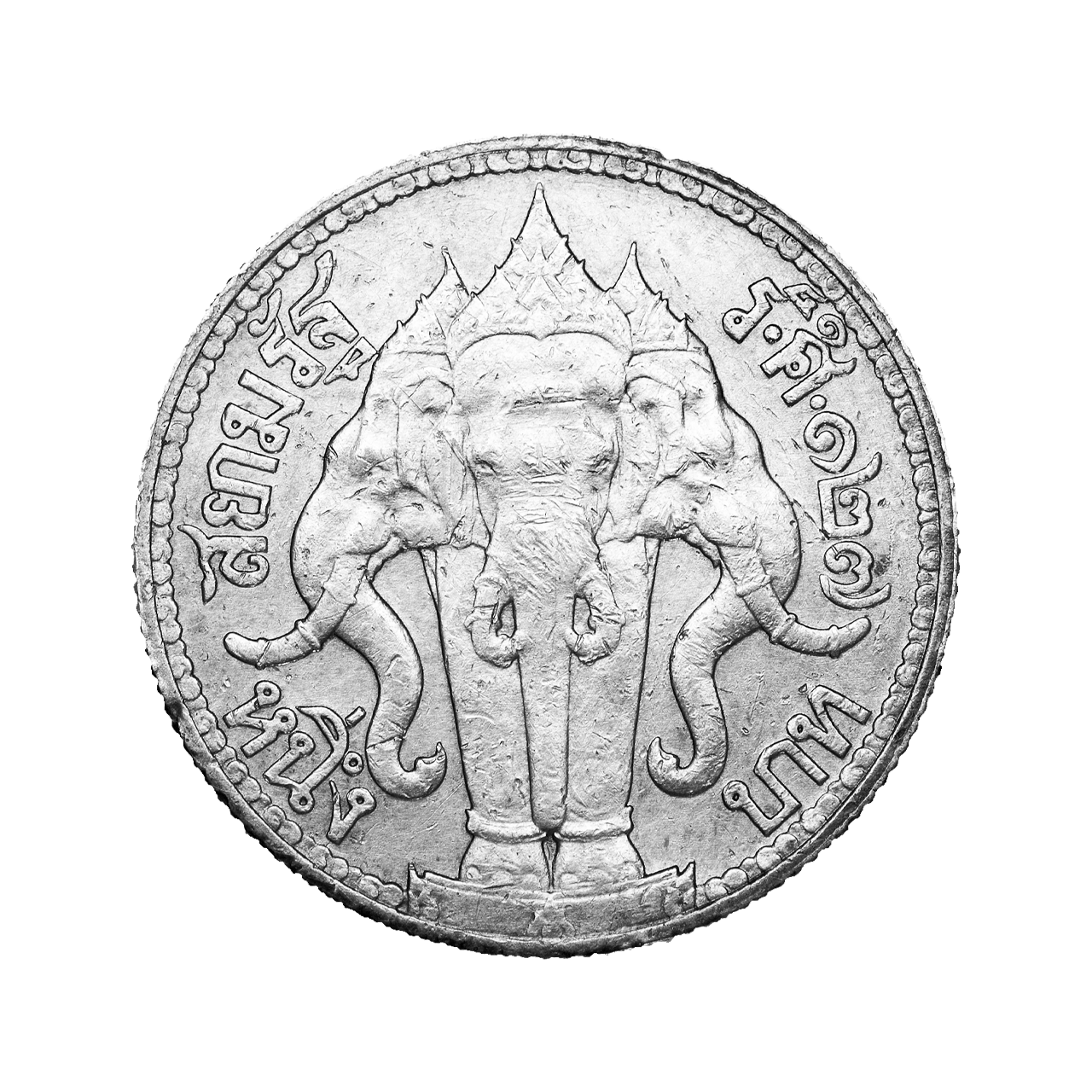
back

=== 1910-1918, Last silver 1 baht coins ===
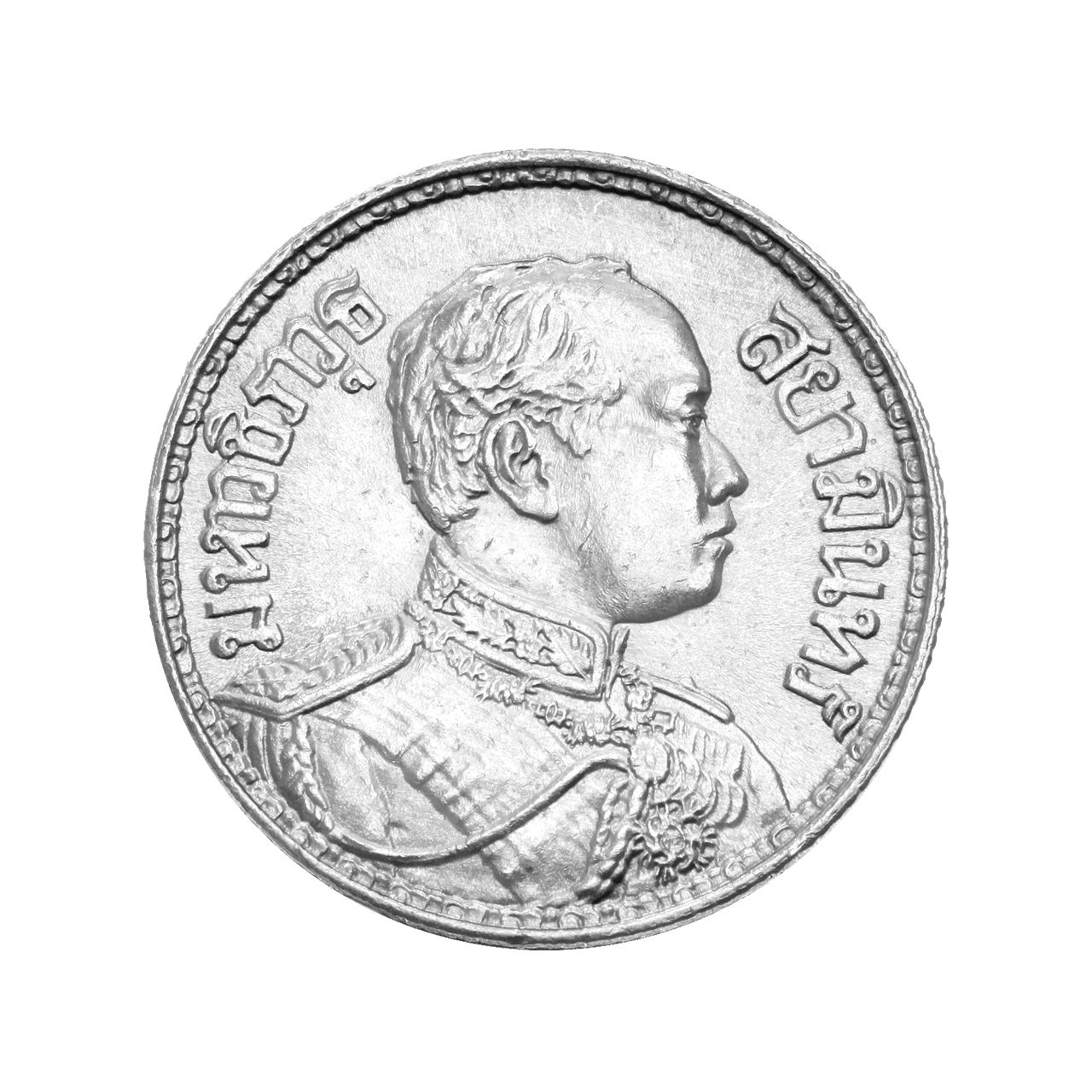
1913 8th issue, 1 baht

The final era of silver baht coinage occurred between 1910 and 1914, when Siam continued to mint the baht in solid silver according to long-standing specifications inherited from the silver-standard period. The outbreak of the First World War, however, caused a sharp rise in global silver prices, pushing the intrinsic value of the metal above the face value of the coin. As a result, Siam faced increased hoarding of high-value silver coins, widespread melting and withdrawal of baht pieces from circulation, and sharply rising production costs at the Royal Mint. These pressures led the government to scale back silver coinage and examine the possibility of transitioning away from precious-metal currency. By the late 1910s, the baht remained legally defined as a silver unit, but its continued production had become increasingly impractical.

Between 1916 and 1918, Siam began moving toward fiat, non-intrinsic coinage, particularly in the newly expanded nickel and copper satang denominations that replaced earlier silver fractions. Although the Royal Siam Mint maintained domestic production, foreign facilities such as the Paris Mint, first engaged under Rama V, were again utilized to supply dies and occasional coinage runs during the early reign of Rama VI. By the end of the First World War, the rising cost and scarcity of silver had effectively halted the minting of full-silver baht coins. These pieces remained in circulation but became progressively less common. As other silver coinage, mainly 25 and 50 satang coins, boar the brunt of the devaluations and debasement of silver until they weren't made of silver anymore.

The last silver baht coins would be minted in 1957, in which the contained 0.030 or 3% silver content.

=== 1918-1957, 1 baht out of circulation ===
There were no 1 baht coins minted during this period.

=== from 1957 onwards, reintroduction of 1 baht coins. ===
Though there had been plans to introduce 1 baht coins during Rama VIII's series, no actual circulation coins were released, only patterns pieces were made.

Last silver coin

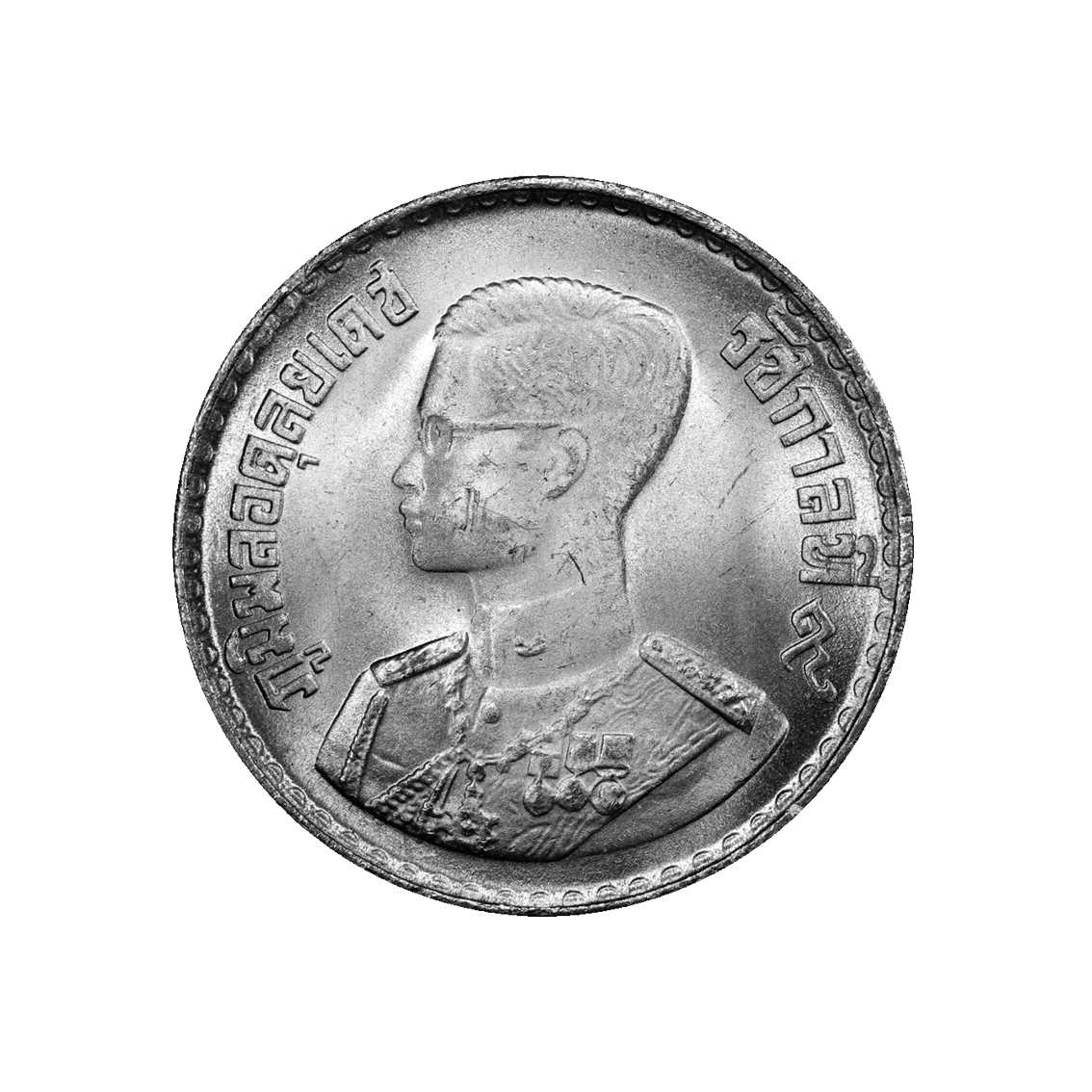
front

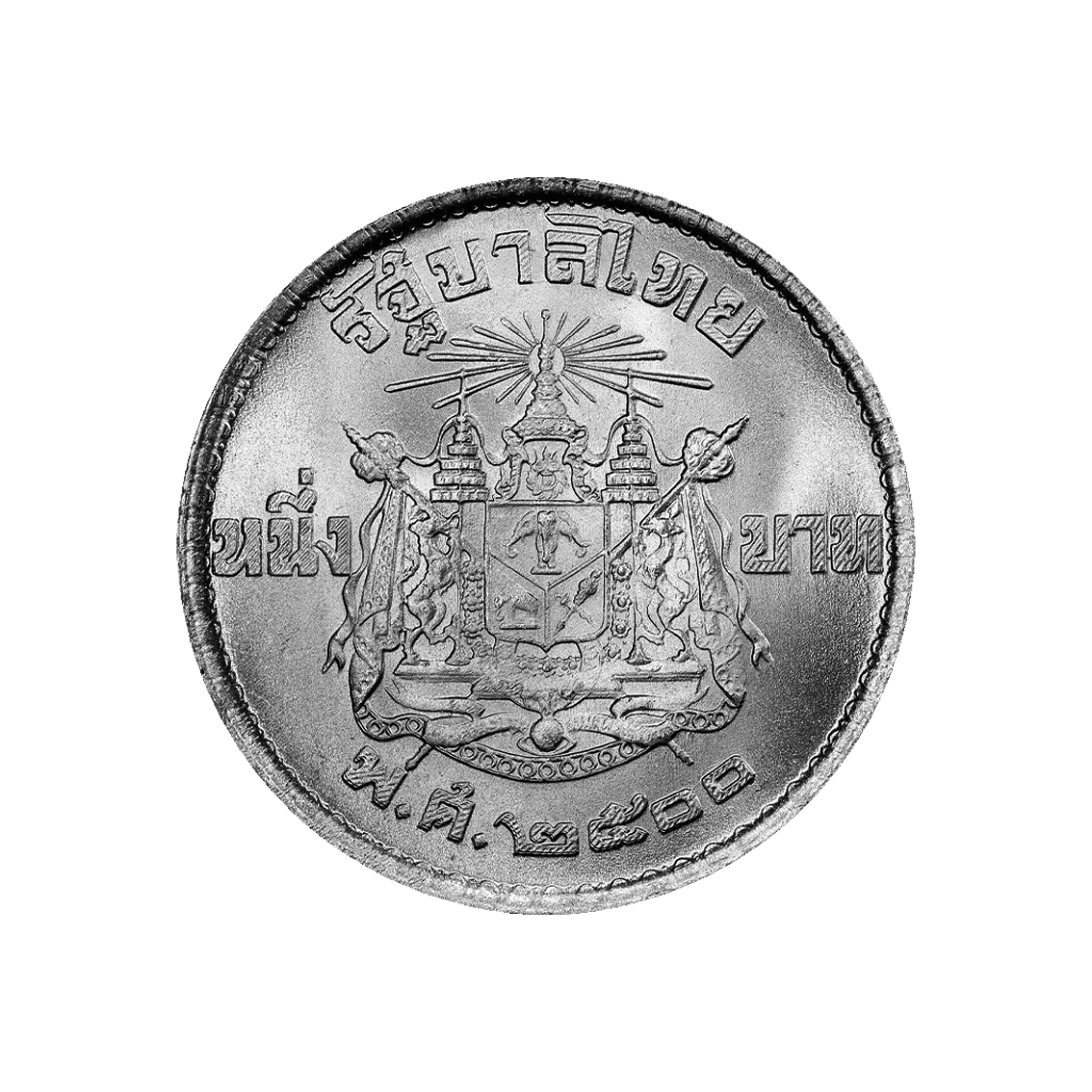
back

Beginning in 1957, Thailand introduced a new era of modern circulating coinage under the reign of King Bhumibol Adulyadej (Rama IX). That year marked the reintroduction of the 1-baht coin, produced in a billon alloy composed primarily of copper and nickel with small amounts of silver and zinc. The coin featured a portrait of King Bhumibol on the obverse and carried national emblems on the reverse, marking the first significant redesign of the baht in the post-war period. This issue signaled Thailand’s full transition away from intrinsic-value metals, following several decades of declining silver coinage and the adoption of fiat currency during the early 20th century. The new 1-baht coin weighed approximately 7.15 grams and measured 26.9 mm in diameter, reflecting a deliberate shift toward durable but inexpensive metals suitable for high-volume circulation.

First non-silver baht coin

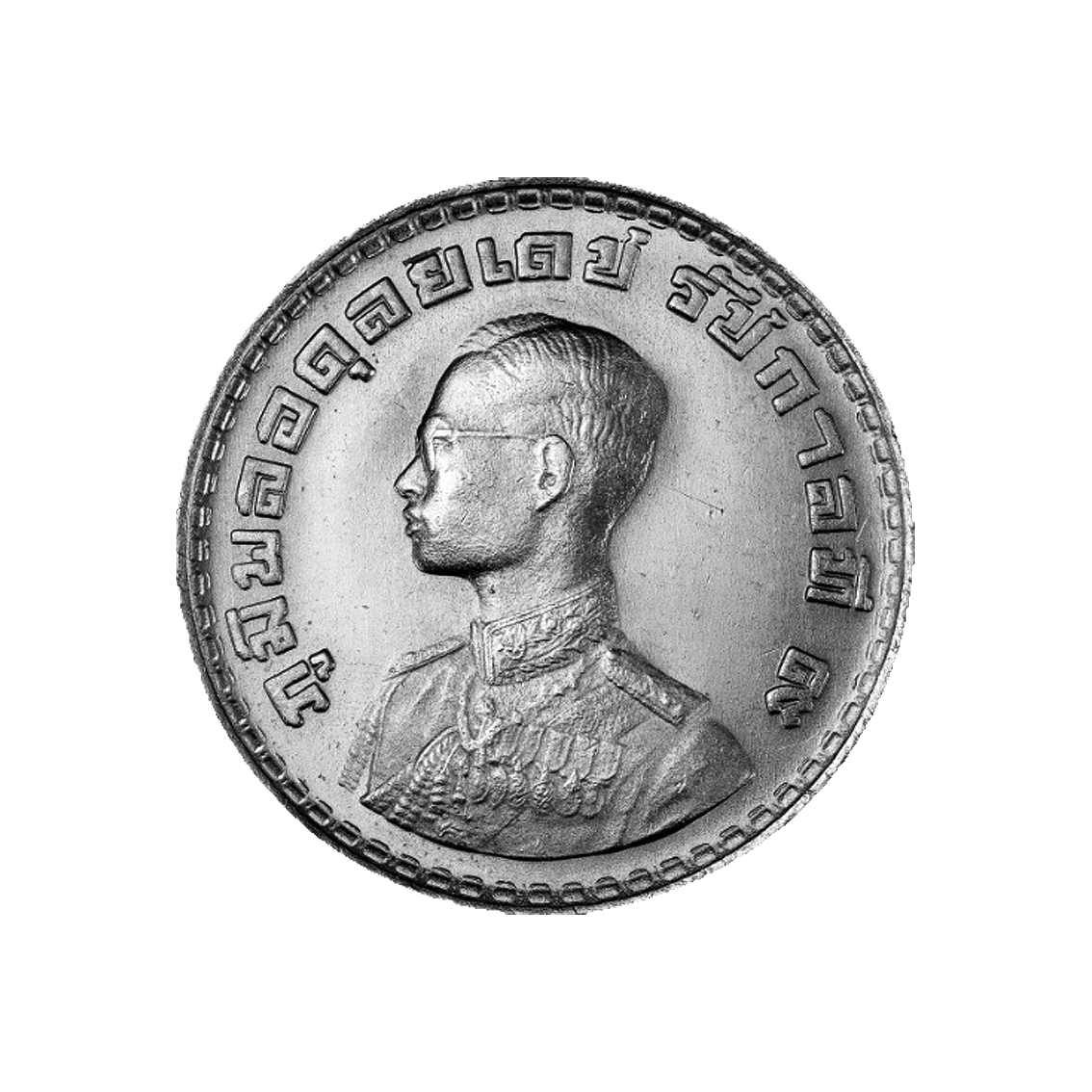
front

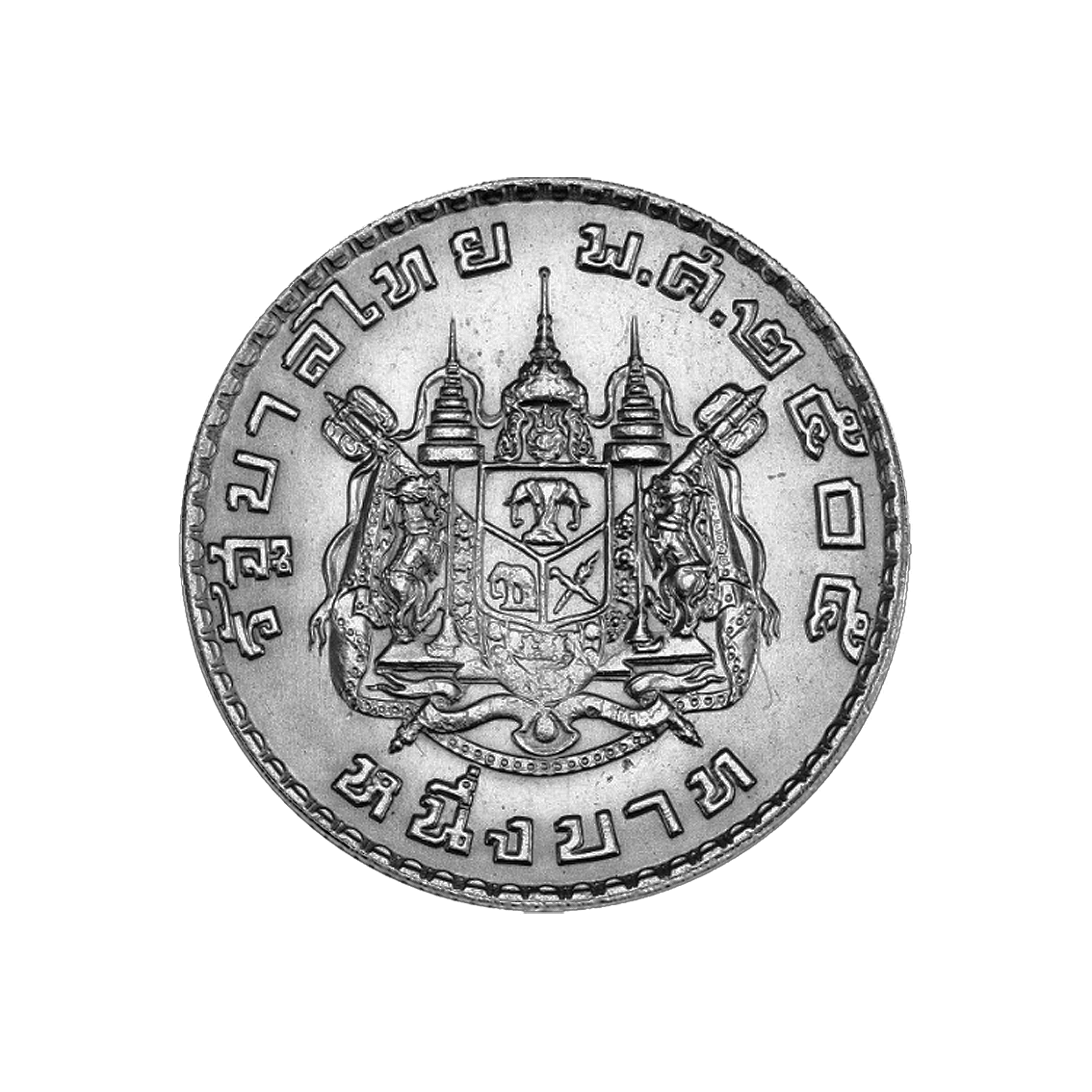
back

Further reforms occurred in 1962, when the 1-baht coin was revised and struck in cupronickel, establishing a composition that would define the denomination for much of the late 20th century. The following decades saw continued modernization of Thailand’s coinage, with adjustments to size, weight, and metal content to meet changing economic conditions and rising production costs. New denominations, such as the 5-baht and 10-baht coins, were gradually introduced, while fractional satang coins were resized and reduced in metal value as inflation and circulation patterns shifted. Throughout the Rama IX era, Thai coins underwent several portrait and reverse-design updates, which standardized designs that remained in use until the currency adjustments following the accession of King Rama X.

== Types and Specification ==
1 Baht Coin
Gold
Years	Content	Diameter	Mass
1864	91.67% Gold, 8.33% Copper	31mm x 2.00mm	~ 15.00 g
Silver
before 1869	>90% Silver, <10% Copper	31mm x 2.00mm	~ 15.45g
1869-1876	>90% Silver, <10% Copper	30mm x 2.28mm	~ 15.00g
1876-1907	>90% Silver, <10% Copper	31mm x 2.10mm	~ 15.10g
1907-1910	90% Silver, 10% Copper	31mm x 3.0mm	~15.00g
1910-1918	90% Silver, 10% Copper	31mm x 3.0mm	~15.00g
Modern
1 Baht Coin
1946	100% Tin	26.9mm x 1.8mm	~ 7.5g
1957	3% Silver, 64% Copper, 23% Nickel, 10% Zinc	26.9mm x 1.8mm	7.15g
1962-1974	75% Copper, 25% Nickel	26.9mm x 1.8mm	7.50g
1974-1977	75% Copper, 25% Nickel	25.0mm x 1.8mm	7.00g
1977-1982	75% Copper, 25% Nickel	25.0mm x 1.8mm	7.00g
1982-1987	75% Copper, 25% Nickel	25.0mm x 1.8mm	7.00g
1987-2008	75% Copper, 25% Nickel	20.0mm x 1.48mm	3.40g
2008–present	(Nickel-plated steel) >99% Steel, <1% Nickel	20.0mm x 1.48mm	3.00g

== Circulation figures and mintages ==
Issue 1
Year (Gregorian Calendar)	Year (Buddhist Era)	Year written on coin	Year Text	Mintage
No one-baht coins were minted

Issue 2
Year (Gregorian Calendar)	Year (Buddhist Era)	Year written on coin	Year Text	Mintage
1857	2400	not written		unknown
1860	2403	not written		unknown
1863	2406	not written		unknown

Issue 3
Year (Gregorian Calendar)	Year (Buddhist Era)	Year written on coin	Year Text	Mintage
1869	2412	not written		unknown

Issue 4
Year (Gregorian Calendar)	Year (Buddhist Era)	Year written on coin	Year Text	Mintage
1872 to 1900	2415 to 2445	not written		unknown
1901	2444	RS. 120	๑๒๐	unknown
1902	2445	RS. 121	๑๒๑	4 070 000
1903	2446	RS. 122	๑๒๒	19 150 000
1904	2447	RS. 123	๑๒๓	4 790 000
1905	2448	RS. 124	๑๒๔	6 770 000
1606	2449	RS. 125	๑๒๕	unknown
1907	2450	RS. 126	๑๒๖	unknown

Issue 7
Year (Gregorian Calendar)	Year (Buddhist Era)	Year written on coin	Year Text	Mintage
1908	2451	RS. 127	ร.ศ. ๑๒๐	1 036 691
1910	2453	RS. 129	ร.ศ. ๑๒๙	unknown

Issue 8
Year (Gregorian Calendar)	Year (Buddhist Era)	Year written on coin	Year Text	Mintage
1913	2456		๒๔๕๖	2 690 000
1914	2457		๒๔๕๗	490 000
1915	2458		๒๔๕๘	5 000 000
1916	2459		๒๔๕๙	9 080 000
1917	2460		๒๔๖๐	14 340 000
1918	2461		๒๔๖๑	3 840 000

Issue 12
Year (Gregorian Calendar)	Year (Buddhist Era)	Year written on coin	Year Text	Mintage
1957	2500		พ.ศ. ๒๕๐๐	3 143 000
1962	2505		พ.ศ. ๒๕๐๕	883 086 000

Issue 13
Year (Gregorian Calendar)	Year (Buddhist Era)	Year written on coin	Year Text	Mintage
1974	2517		พ.ศ. ๒๕๑๗	248 978 000

Issue 14
Year (Gregorian Calendar)	Year (Buddhist Era)	Year written on coin	Year Text	Mintage
1977	2520		พ.ศ. ๒๕๒๐	506 460 000

Issue 15
Year (Gregorian Calendar)	Year (Buddhist Era)	Year written on coin	Year Text	Mintage
1982	2525		พ.ศ. ๒๕๒๕	4 150 000
1983	2526		พ.ศ. ๒๕๒๖	38 735 000
1984	2527		พ.ศ. ๒๕๒๗	108 995 000
1985	2528		พ.ศ. ๒๕๒๘	105 465 000

Issue 16 (1st portrait)
Year (Gregorian Calendar)	Year (Buddhist Era)	Year written on coin	Year Text	Mintage
1986	2529		พ.ศ. ๒๕๒๙	4 200 000
1987	2530		พ.ศ. ๒๕๓๐	329 271 000
1988	2531		พ.ศ. ๒๕๓๑	391 442 000
1989	2532		พ.ศ. ๒๕๓๒	466 684 000
1990	2533		พ.ศ. ๒๕๓๓	409 924 000
1991	2534		พ.ศ. ๒๕๓๔	329 946 380
1992	2535		พ.ศ. ๒๕๓๕	426 230 000
1993	2536		พ.ศ. ๒๕๓๖	235 623 000
1994	2537		พ.ศ. ๒๕๓๗	475 200 000
1995	2538		พ.ศ. ๒๕๓๘	589 394 650
1996	2539		พ.ศ. ๒๕๓๙	98 487 000
1997	2540		พ.ศ. ๒๕๔๐	350 660 600
1998	2541		พ.ศ. ๒๕๔๑	25 252 000
1999	2542		พ.ศ. ๒๕๔๒	224 389 000
2000	2543		พ.ศ. ๒๕๔๓	468 610 000
2001	2544		พ.ศ. ๒๕๔๔	385 140 000
2002	2545		พ.ศ. ๒๕๔๕	266 025 000
2003	2546		พ.ศ. ๒๕๔๖	23 653 300
2004	2547		พ.ศ. ๒๕๔๗	903 964 000
2005	2548		พ.ศ. ๒๕๔๘	1 137 820 000
2006	2549		พ.ศ. ๒๕๔๙	778 761 000
2007	2550		พ.ศ. ๒๕๕๐	614 866 877
2008	2551		พ.ศ. ๒๕๕๑	660 307 123
Issue 16 (2nd portrait)
2009	2552		พ.ศ. ๒๕๕๒	753 250 000
2010	2553		พ.ศ. ๒๕๕๓	1 187 829 000
2011	2554		พ.ศ. ๒๕๕๔	795 850 000
2012	2555		พ.ศ. ๒๕๕๕	964 338 550
2013	2556		พ.ศ. ๒๕๕๖	760 121 500
2014	2557		พ.ศ. ๒๕๕๗	unknown
2015	2558		พ.ศ. ๒๕๕๘	unknown
2016	2559		พ.ศ. ๒๕๕๙	746 900 000
2017	2560		พ.ศ. ๒๕๖๐	930 250 000

== Commemorative issues ==
- Commemoration of King Bhumibol Adulyadej and the Queen Sirikit return from the World visit.
- The 3rd Cycle Birthday of King Bhumibol Adulyadej.
- The 5th Asian Games.
- The 6th Asian Games.
- Commemorative of the Food and Agriculture Organisation FAO (1972).
- Commemoration of HRH Crown Prince Vajiralongkorn.
- The 25th Anniversary of the World Health Organization.
- The 8th SEAP Games.
- The 75th Anniversary of Princess Mother Srinagarindra.
- Commemorative of the Food and Agriculture Organisation FAO (1977).
- Commemoration of Princess Sirindhorn graduated from Chulalongkorn University.
- Commemoration of HRH Princess Sirindhorn.
- The 8th Asian Games.
- Commemoration of the World Food Day.
- The 50th Anniversary Celebrations of the King Bhumibol Adulyadej's Accession.
