= Silver coin =

Form of coinage

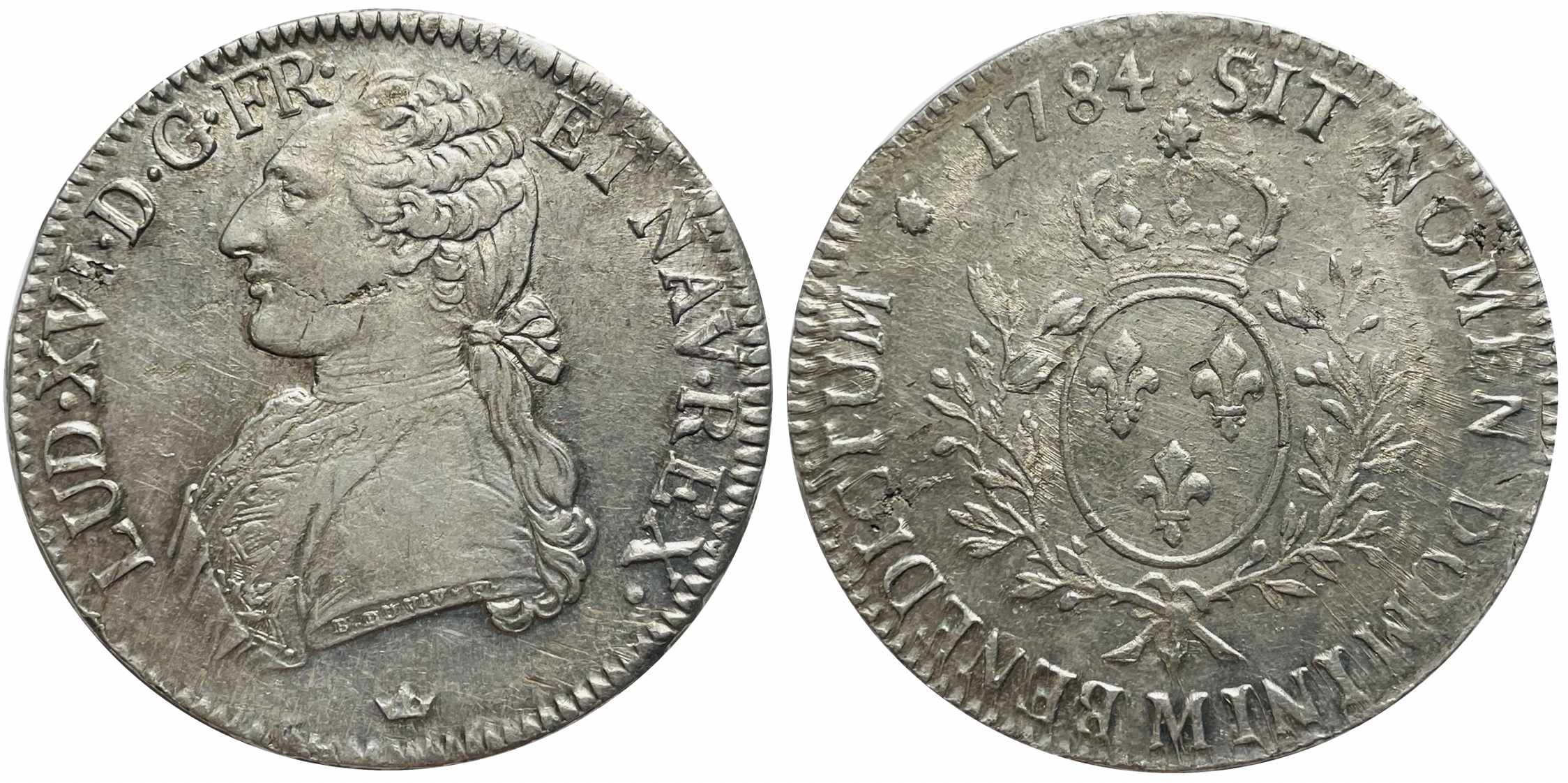
A silver écu, minted in 1784, depicting Louis XVI, King of France.

Silver coins are one of the oldest mass-produced form of coinage. Silver has been used as a coinage metal since the times of the Greeks; their silver drachmas were popular trade coins. The ancient Persians used silver coins between 612–330 BC. Before 1797, British pennies were made of silver.

As with all collectible coins, many factors determine the value of a silver coin, such as its rarity, demand, condition and the number originally minted. Ancient silver coins coveted by collectors include the Denarius and Miliarense, while more recent collectible silver coins include the Morgan Dollar and the Spanish Milled Dollar.

Other than collector's silver coins, silver bullion coins are popular among people who desire a "hedge" against currency inflation or store of value. Silver has an international currency symbol of XAG under ISO 4217.

== Origins and early development of silver coins ==
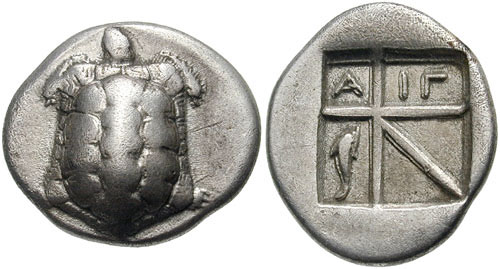
Silver drachma from the island of Aegina, after 404 BC

The earliest coins in the world were minted in the kingdom of Lydia in Asia Minor around 600 BC. The coins of Lydia were made of electrum, which is a naturally occurring alloy of gold and silver, that was available within the territory of Lydia. The concept of coinage, i.e. stamped lumps of metal of a specified weight, quickly spread to adjacent regions, such as Aegina. In these neighbouring regions, inhabited by Greeks, coins were mostly made of silver. As Greek merchants traded with Greek communities (colonies) throughout the Mediterranean Sea, the Greek coinage concept soon spread through trade to the entire Mediterranean region. These early Greek silver coins were denominated in staters or drachmas and its fractions (obols).

More or less simultaneously with the development of the Lydian and Greek coinages, a coinage system was developed independently in China. The Chinese coins, however, were a different concept and they were made of bronze.

In the Mediterranean region, the silver and other precious metal coins were later supplemented with local bronze coinages, that served as small change, useful for transactions where small sums were involved.

The coins of the Greeks were issued by a great number of city-states, and each coin carried an indication of its place of origin. The coinage systems were not entirely the same from one place to another. However, the so-called Attic standard, Corinthian standard, Aiginetic standard and other standards defined the proper weight of each coin. Each of these standards were used in multiple places throughout the Mediterranean region.

In the 4th century BC, the Kingdom of Macedonia came to dominate the Greek world. The most powerful of their kings, Alexander the Great eventually launched an attack on the Persian Empire, defeating and conquering it. Alexander's Empire fell apart after his death in 323 BC, and the eastern mediterranean region and western Asia (previously Persian territory) were divided into a small number of kingdoms, replacing the city-state as the principal unit of Greek government. Greek coins were now issued by kings, and only to a lesser extent by cities. Greek rulers were now minting coins as far away as Egypt and central Asia. The tetradrachm (four drachms) was a popular coin throughout the region. This era is referred to as the hellenistic era.

While much of the Greek world was being transformed into monarchies, the Romans were expanding their control throughout the Italian Peninsula. The Romans minted their first coins during the early 3rd century BC. The earliest coins were - like other coins in the region - silver drachms with a supplementary bronze coinage. They later reverted to the silver denarius as their principal coin. The denarius remained an important Roman coin until the Roman economy began to crumble. During the 3rd century AD, the antoninianus was minted in quantity. This was originally a "silver" coin with low silver content, but developed through stages of debasement (sometimes silver washed) to pure bronze coins.

Although many regions ruled by Hellenistic monarchs were brought under Roman control, this did not immediately lead to a unitary monetary system throughout the Mediterranean region. Local coinage traditions in the eastern regions prevailed, while the denarius dominated the western regions. The local Greek coinages are known as Greek Imperial coins.

Apart from the Greeks and the Romans, other peoples in the Mediterranean region also issued coins. These include the Phoenicians, the Carthaginians, the Jews, the Celts and various regions in the Iberian Peninsula and the Arab Peninsula.

In regions to the East of the Roman Empire, that were formerly controlled by the Hellenistic Seleucids, the Parthians created an empire in Persia. The Parthians issued a relatively stable series of silver drachms and tetradrachms. After the Parthians were overthrown by the Sassanians in 226 AD, the new dynasty of Persia began the minting of their distinct thin, spread fabric silver drachms, that became a staple of their empire right up to the Arab conquest in the 7th century AD.

== Early Middle Ages (5th-10th centuries) ==
In the Byzantine Empire, which was basically what was left of the eastern Roman Empire, the currency system was reorganised, but the coinage mostly consisted of copper and gold. A silver miliaresion was developed, usually with a cross on steps obverse and an inscription forming the reverse. Later, the cup-shaped (or 'scyphate') trachy were issued, but the silver content of these rapidly declined towards only a few per cent, later ending up as a pure copper coin after the Fourth Crusade (13th century).

Muhammad established the Constitution of Medina in 622 in the Arabian Peninsula. After the death of Mohammed in 632, the state was governed by caliphs, thus named 'the Caliphate'. As the caliphate expanded into Byzantine territories to the Northwest and conquered the Sassanian (Persian) Empire to the Northeast, the question of a caliphal coinage became imminent. The caliphate adapted the Sassanian drachm as their silver coin. Initially, Arabic inscriptions were added to the Sassanian coin type. Later, the type was completely revised, so as to include inscriptions and ornaments only. (Depictions of human beings is prohibited according to Sunni Islam). These coins are known in Arabic as dirhems. The dirhems of the caliphate gained wide acceptance. They are consequently found along trading routes in Ukraine, Russia and Scandinavia.

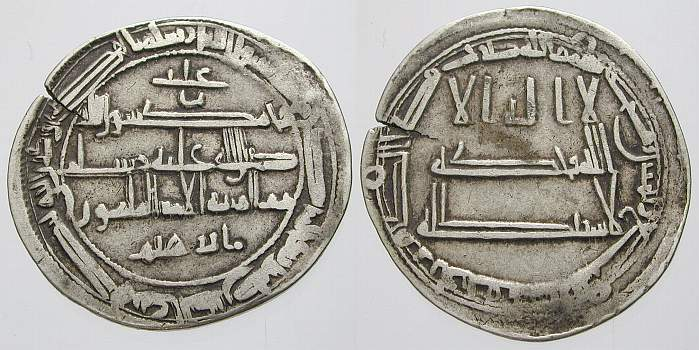
Dirham minted in the name of the Aghlabid ruler Ibrahim I (800-812) and the Abbasid Caliph al-Ma'mun (813-832). It is similar to regular Abbasid dirhams but showing early signs of emerging independent coin types.

As the power balance within the caliphate changed (weaker central power), the names of local leaders, or feudal lords, were increasingly indicated on the dirhems. Various Arabic dynasties continued to issue dirhems for centuries after the demise of the classical caliphates. There is a great variety of types, although retaining the inscriptions and ornaments only formula.

In medieval Europe (outside the Byzantine Empire), the coinage was very complex, as the types were often different from one (small) region to another. In some regions, certain coin types became a commonly accepted coin type in inter-regional trade. For instance, the silver sceattas were a popular type of coin in England, the Netherlands and the Frisian region. The penny was a popular interregional silver coin, thus being known in several different languages as 'penny' (English), 'pfennig' (German) and 'penning' (Scandinavian languages). Medieval coin types frequently suffered from gradual debasement, and the coins were generally small. This changed when the great amounts of silver began to flow into Europe from the New World.

== Early Modern period ==
=== Ottoman Empire and Persia ===
While the Byzantine Empire in the Balkans was crumbling, a new power was growing strong in Asia Minor: the Ottoman state. The Ottomans eventually conquered the Byzantine capital in 1453, creating the Ottoman Empire. Early Ottoman silver coins are the small akçes.

With the accession of the Safavid dynasty, Persia emerged as an independent state, also in terms of language and identity. This coincided with a shift from the use of Arabic to Persian in the coins' inscriptions. The coins now tended to employ cursive and interlaced script, radically altering the appearance of the coins.

=== India ===
See also Rupee, Indian rupee, History of the rupee and Coinage of India

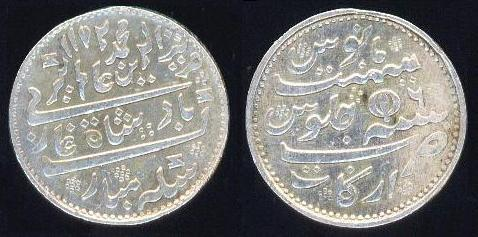
A silver coin made during the reign of the Mughal Emperor Alamgir II

The earliest coins of India are the so-called punch-marked coins. These were small pieces of silver of a specified weight, punched with several dies, each carrying a symbol. These very early coins were issued at a point in time when India was still separated from the Greek world by Persia (Persia proper did not use silver coins at the time).

The Sanskrit word rūpyakam (रूप्यकम्) means "wrought silver" or a coin of silver. The term could also be related to "something provided with an image, a coin," from Sanskrit rūpa "shape, likeness, image."

The word Rupee was adopted by Sher Shah Suri, a renegade governor who broke off from the Mughal Empire and created the Sur Empire during his short rule of northern India between (1540–1545). It was used for the silver coin weighing 178 grains (0.37 troy ounces; 11.5 grams). He also introduced copper coins called Dam and gold coins called Mohur that weighed 169 grains (0.35 ozt; 11.0 g). Later on, the Mughal Emperors standardised this coinage of tri-metalism across the sub-continent in order to consolidate the monetary system.

=== Spanish America, the peso/dollar and Pacific trade ===
With the Spanish colonization of the Americas after 1492, there were significant finds in both New Spain (Mexico) in various sites in mainly in the zone outside indigenous settlement and in Peru, with the discovery of the great silver mine of Potosí (in modern Bolivia). The Spanish crown licensed mining sites with the provision that a fifth of the proceeds, the quinto would go to the crown. The crown established mints in Mexico and Peru, such that over the whole colonial period high quality, uniformly minted coins became the international currency. Not only did silver flow to Spain and then to the rest of Europe, enriching the Spanish crown and stimulating industries in Europe, Spanish silver coins were transported to Asia, via the Manila Galleon. China in particular preferred silver coinage and the high quality Spanish coins paid for high quality Chinese porcelains and silks and other luxury goods. Mexican silver coins continued to be exported to China in the late nineteenth-century.

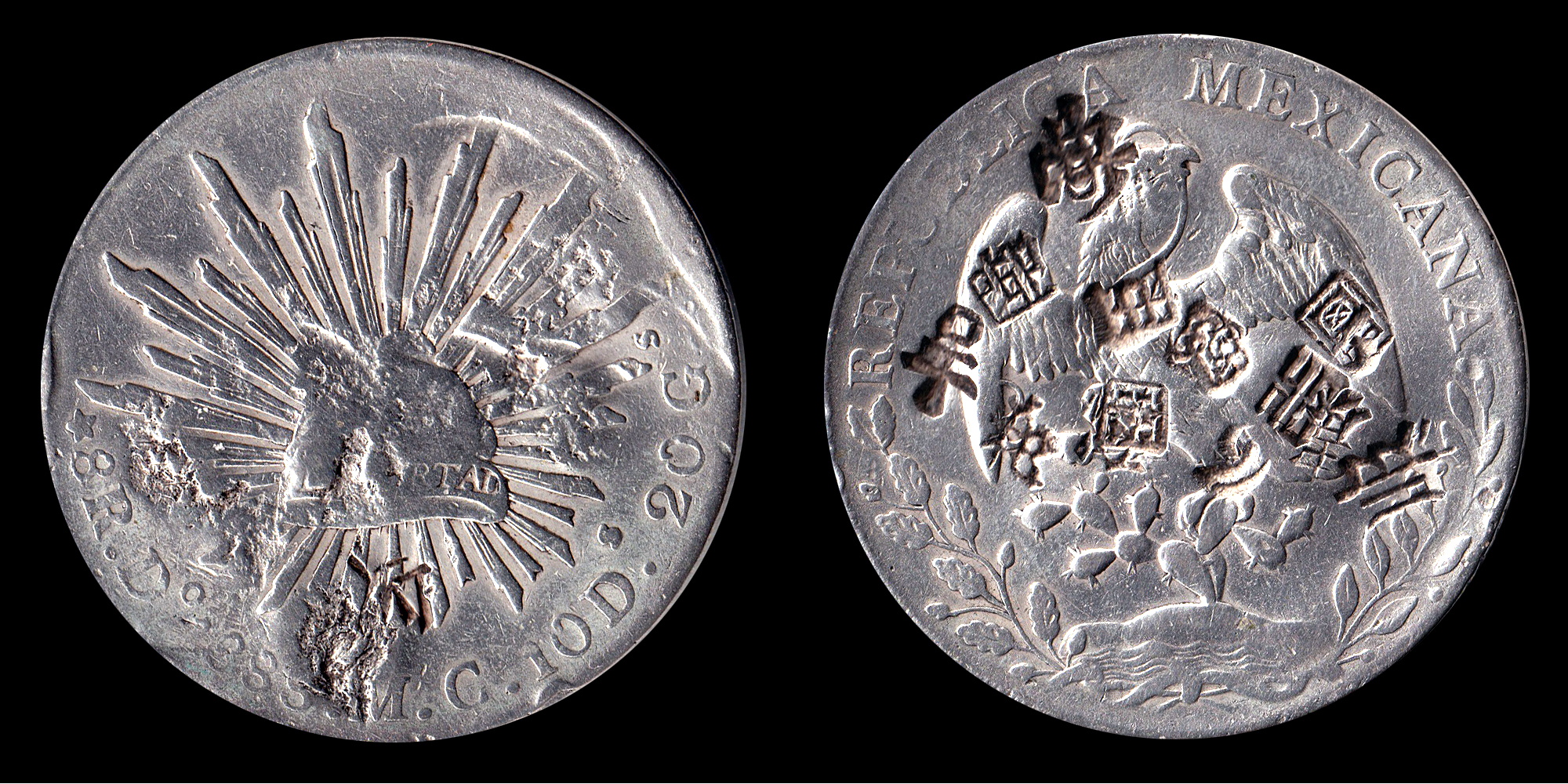
1888 Mexican 8 Real coin with Chinese chop marks

Europeans started silver mining in the "New World" soon after discovery of the Americas to answer a demand for silver in Europe inspired by the fine craftsmanship of the Renaissance. The discovery of silver in Joachimsthal also gave rise to the silver joachimsthaler coin. Production of silver in the Americas influenced trade and politics in Europe and transformed European relations with other regions of the world, particularly China and the Ottoman Empire. The influx of silver into Europe led to the sometimes uncontrolled minting of coins. All countries of Europe eventually began to issue large size silver coins. Europeans then used these silver coins to purchase goods abroad which eventually led to inflation. The great amounts of new silver supply caused the relative value of silver against gold to drop.

=== United States ===
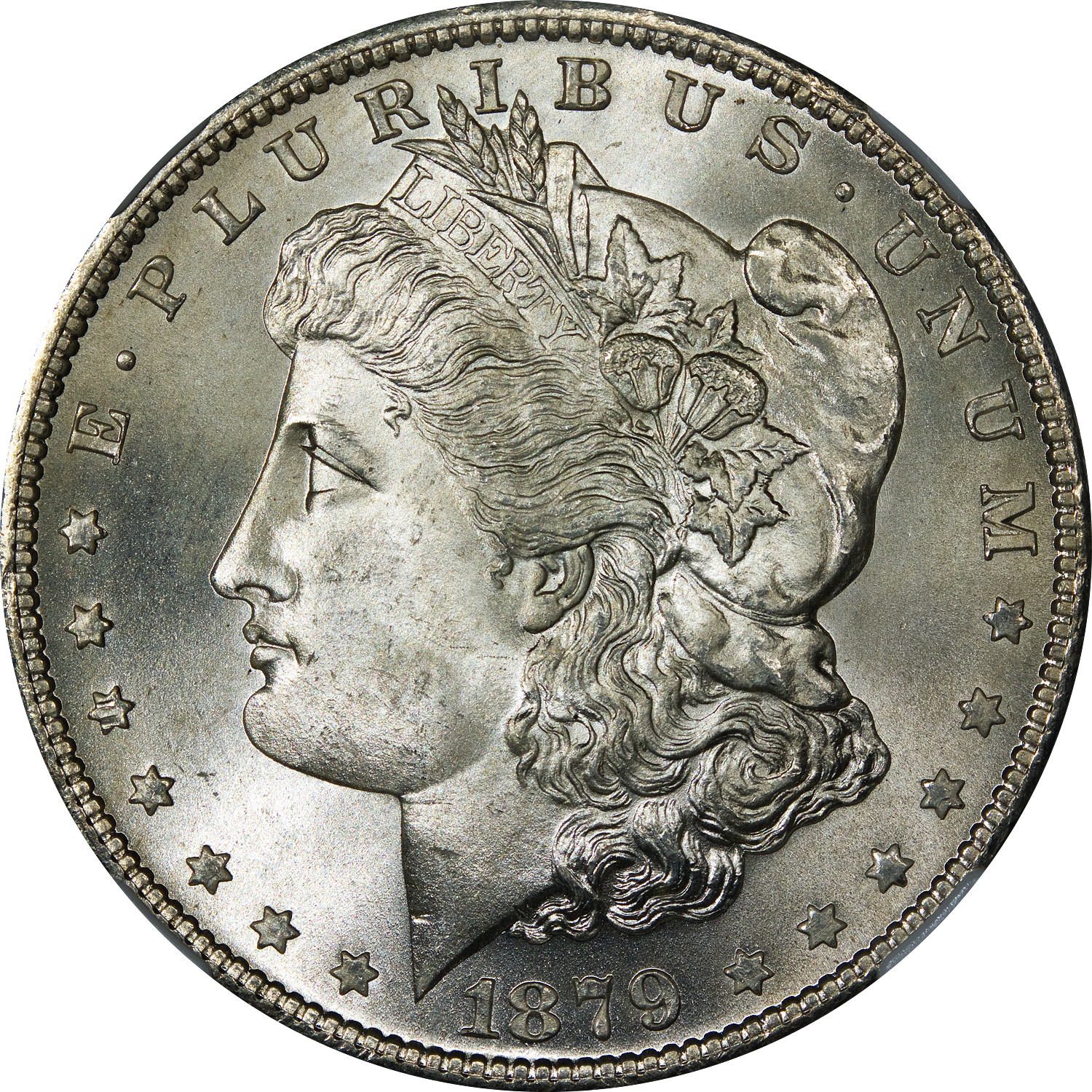
1879-S Morgan Dollar

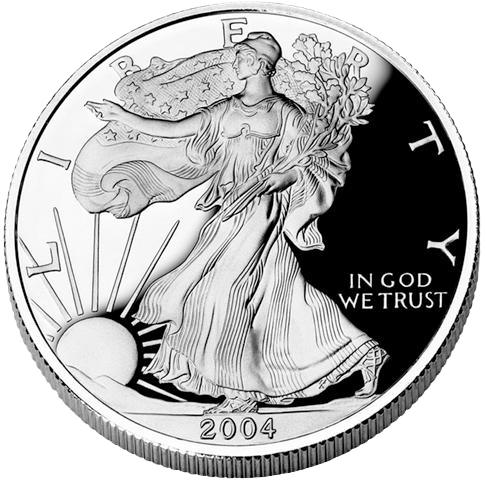
American Silver Eagle

US dimes, quarters, half dollars and dollars were minted in 90% silver until 1964.

Produced to save nickel for the war effort, war nickels 1942-1945 are 35% silver (silver nickel production started part way into 1942). Half-dollar coins minted between 1965 and 1970 are 40% silver, but from 1971 on, contain no silver.

After silver was removed from US circulating coins the US Mint made special commemorative coins minted for sale to coin collectors and, starting in 1986, bullion coins primarily sold to investors. Both types, although legal tender, are not expected to circulate for commerce.

== Modern silver minting ==
=== Bullion coins ===
Various governments mint, or authorize the minting of, silver bullion coins with a nominal face value in the national currency. The face value is nominal because the value stated on the coin is much less than the value of the silver in the coin.

=== Silver rounds ===
Privately minted "silver rounds" or "generic silver rounds" are called "rounds" instead of "coins" because the US Mint and other government mints reserve the use of the word "coin" for government-issued currency with a face value expressed in the national currency. The privately minted "rounds" usually have a set weight of 1 troy ounce (31.103 g) of 99.9% silver, with the dimensions of 2.54 millimetres (1/10 in) thick and 39 millimetres (1 9/16 in) across. These carry all sorts of designs, from assayer/mine-backed bullion to engravable gifts, automobiles, firearms, armed forces commemorative, and holidays. Unlike silver bullion coins, silver rounds carry no face value and are not considered legal tender. Similarly, both government and private sector mints issue silver bars for investors and collectors without a nominal face value.

== Evolution ==
Silver coins have evolved in many different forms through the ages; a rough timeline for silver coins is as follows:

- Silver coins circulated widely as money in Europe and later the Americas from before the time of Alexander the Great until the 1960s.
- 16th - 19th centuries: World silver crowns, the most famous is arguably the Mexican 8 reales (also known as Spanish dollar), minted in many different parts of the world to facilitate trade. Size is more or less standardized at around 38mm with many minor variations in weight and sizes among different issuing nations. Declining towards the end of the 19th century due to the introduction of secure printing of paper currency. It is no longer convenient to carry sacks of silver coins when they can be deposited in the bank for a certificate of deposit carrying the same value. Smaller denominations exist to complement currency usability by the public.
- 1870s - 1930s: Silver trade dollars, a world standard of its era in weight and purity following the example of the older Mexican 8 Reales to facilitate trade in the Far East. Examples: French Indochina Piastres, British Trade Dollar, US Trade Dollar, Japanese 1 Yen, Chinese 1 Dollar. Smaller denomination exists to complement currency usability by the public.
- 1930s - 1960s: Alloyed in circulating coins of many different governments of the world. This period ended when it was no longer economical for world governments to keep silver as an alloying element in their circulating coins.
- 1960's -1970's: Some circulating coins still used silver in their composition, such as 1965-70 Kennedy half dollar coins, which were debased from 90% silver to 40% silver. However, as silver's metal value continued to increase, resulting in additional hoarding by the public, these coins were eventually debased entirely to cupronickel clad coinage.
- 1960s - current: Modern crown sized commemoratives, using the weight and size of the old world crowns.
- 1980 - current: Modern silver bullion coins, mainly from 39 mm - 42 mm diameter, containing 1 troy ounce (31.103 g) of pure silver in content, regardless of purity. Smaller and bigger sizes exist mainly to complement the collectible set for numismatics market. Some are also purchased as a mean for the masses to buy a standardized store of value, which in this case is silver.

== Advantages of silver coinage ==
Silver coins were among the first coins ever used, thousands of years ago. The silver standard was used for centuries in many places of the world. There were multiple reasons for using silver instead of other materials for coins:

- Silver has market liquidity, is easily tradable.
- Silver is easily transportable. The elements silver and gold have a high value to weight ratio.
- Silver can be divided into small units without losing significant value; precious metals can be coined from bars, and later melted down into bars again.
- A silver coin is fungible: that is, one unit or piece of the same denomination and origin is equivalent to another.
- Most silver coin have a certain standard weight, or measure, making it easy to infer the weight of a number of coins from their number.
- A silver (alloy) coin is durable and long lasting (pure silver is relatively soft and subject to wear) . A silver coin is not subject to decay.
- A silver coin has intrinsic value, although the price of silver bullion coins is subject to market swings and general inflation. Silver has always been a rare metal.
- Because silver is less valuable than gold, it is more practical for small, everyday transactions.

== Cultural traditions ==
A silver coin or coins sometimes are placed under the mast or in the keel of a ship as a good luck charm. This tradition probably originated with the Romans. The tradition continues in modern times, for example, officers of USS New Orleans placed 33 coins heads up under her foremast and mainmast before she was launched in 1933 and USS Higgins, commissioned in 1999, had 11 coins specially selected for her mast stepping.

== See also ==
- Bullion
- Euro gold and silver commemorative coins
- Inflation hedge
- Millesimal fineness
- Silver
- Silver as an investment
- Silver coins of the German Empire
- Store of value
