= Bezant =

Generic medieval Western European name for eastern gold coins

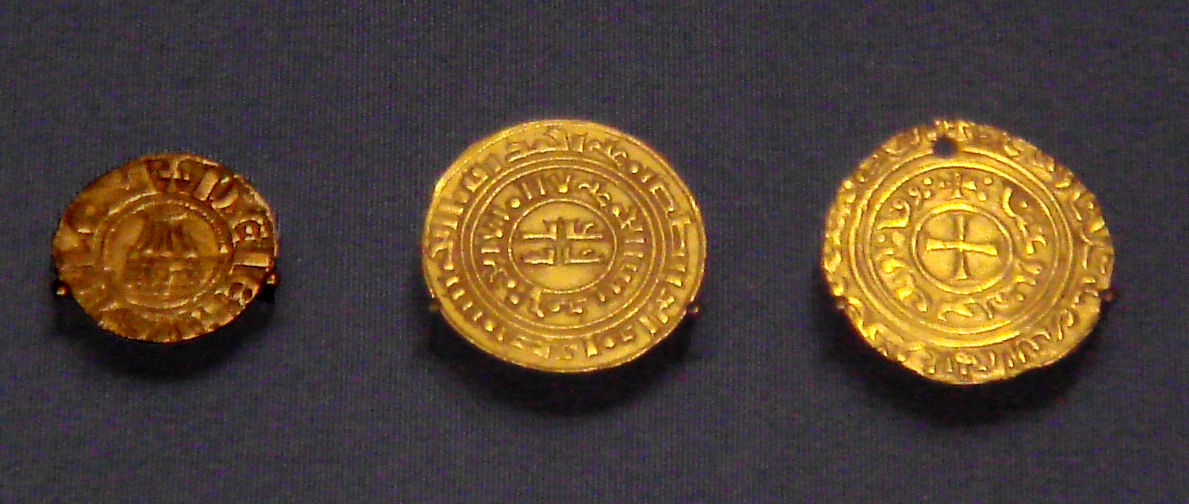
Crusader coins of the Kingdom of Jerusalem: Denier in European style with Holy Sepulchre (1162–1175); Kufic gold bezant, imitation of the Fatimid dinar (1140–1180); gold bezant with Christian symbol (1250s) (British Museum). Gold coins were first copied dinars and bore Kufic script, but after 1250 Christian symbols were added following Papal complaints.

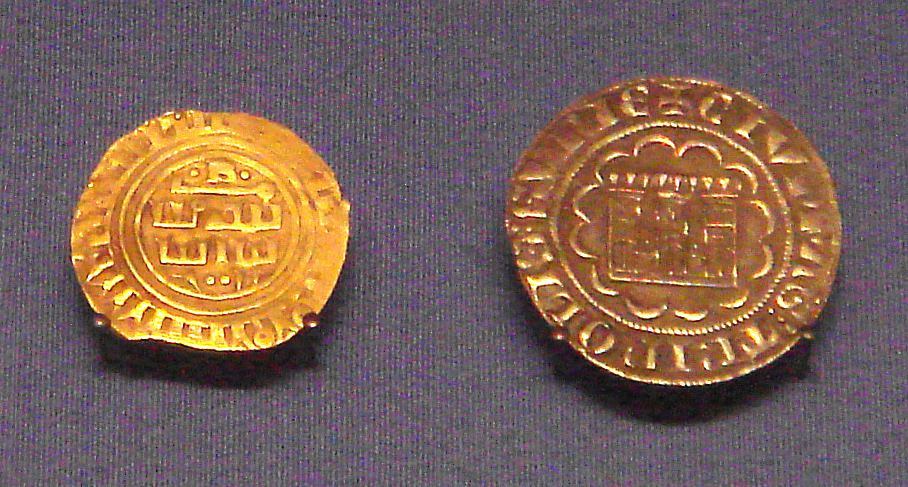
County of Tripoli gold bezant in Arabic (1270–1300), and Tripoli silver gros (1275–1287). British Museum.

In the Middle Ages, the term bezant (Old French: besant, from Latin bizantius aureus) was used in Western Europe to describe several gold coins of the east, all derived ultimately from the Roman solidus. The word itself comes from the Greek Byzantion, the ancient name of Constantinople, the capital of the Byzantine Empire.

The original "bezants" were the gold coins produced by the government of the Byzantine Empire, first the nomisma and from the 11th century the hyperpyron. Later, the term was used to cover the gold dinars produced by Islamic governments. In turn, the gold coins minted in the Kingdom of Jerusalem and County of Tripoli were termed "Saracen bezants" (besantius saracenatus), or "fake dinars" (dīnār ṣūrī), since they were modelled on the Fatimid dinar. A completely different electrum coin based on Byzantine trachea was minted in the Kingdom of Cyprus and called the "white bezant".

The term bezant in reference to coins is common in sources from the 10th through 13th centuries. Thereafter, it was mainly employed as a money of account and in literary and heraldic contexts.

== Medieval history ==
Gold coins were rarely minted in early medieval Western Europe, up until the later 13th century; silver and bronze were the metals of choice for money. Gold coins were almost continually produced by the Byzantines and medieval Arabs. These circulated in Western European trade in smallish numbers, originating from the coinage mints of the Eastern Mediterranean. In Western Europe, the gold coins of Byzantine currency were highly prized. These gold coins were commonly called bezants. The first "bezants" were the Byzantine solidi coins. Later, the name was applied to the hyperpyra, which replaced the solidi in Constantinople in the late 11th century. The name hyperpyron was used by the late medieval Greeks, while the name bezant was used by the late medieval Latin merchants for the same coin. The Italians also used the name perpero or pipero for the same coin (an abridgement of the name hyperpyron).

Medievally from the 12th century onward (if not earlier), the Western European term bezant also meant the gold dinar coins minted by Islamic governments. The Islamic coins were originally modelled on the Byzantine solidus during the early years after the onset of Islam. The term bezant was used in the late medieval Republic of Venice to refer to the Egyptian gold dinar. Marco Polo used the term bezant in the account of his travels to East Asia when describing the currencies of the Yuan Empire around the year 1300. An Italian merchant's handbook dated about 1340, Pratica della mercatura by Pegolotti, used the term bisant for coins of North Africa (including Tunis and Tripoli), Cyprus, Armenia and Tabriz (in today's northwestern Iran), whereas it used the term perpero / pipero for the Byzantine bizant.

Although the medieval "bezant" usually referred to a gold coin, some medieval Latin texts have been noted to expand its usage to cover silver coins. These silver bezants were often called "white bezants". Occasionally in Latin, they were also called "miliaresion bezants" / "miliarense bezants". Like the gold bezants, the silver bezants by definition were issuances by the Byzantine government or by an Arabic government, and not by a Latin government, and the usage of the term was confined to the Latin West.

== Bezants in heraldry ==
In heraldry, a roundel of a gold colour is referred to as a bezant, in reference to the coin. Like many heraldic charges, the bezant originated during the crusading era, when Western European knights first came into contact with Byzantine gold coins, and were perhaps struck with their fine quality and purity. During the Fourth Crusade, the city of Constantinople was sacked by Western forces. During this sacking of the richest city of Europe, the gold bezant would have been very much in evidence, many of the knights no doubt having helped themselves generously to the booty. This event took place at the very dawn of the widespread adoption of arms by the knightly class, and thus it may have been an obvious symbol for many returned crusaders to use in their new arms. When arms are strewn with bezants, the term bezantée or bezanty is used.

Banner of the Duchy of Cornwall displaying fifteen bezants

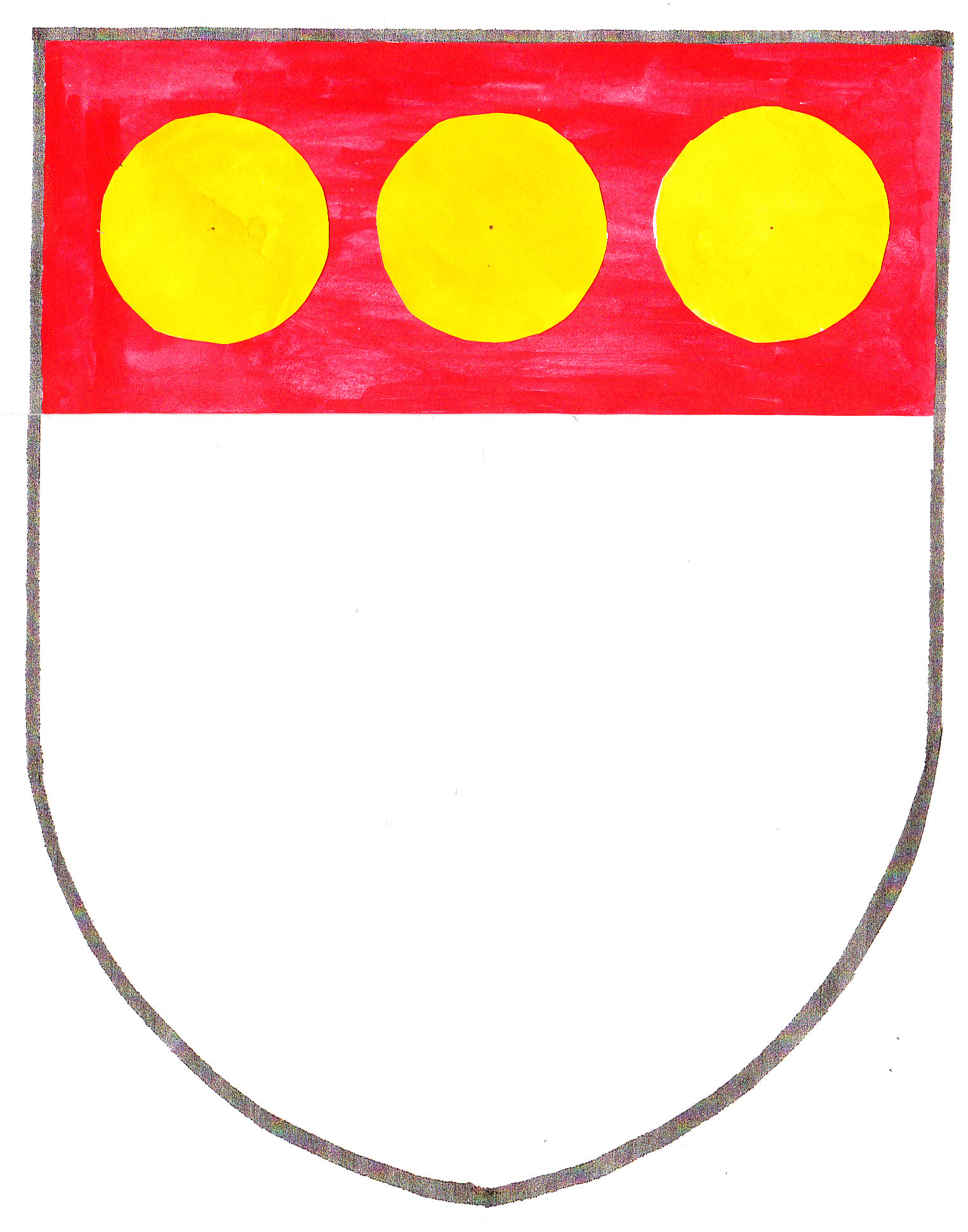
Arms of Sir John Russell, a 13th-century English courtier.

Arms of William Pitt the Younger
