= Tetarteron =

Gold byzantine coin

The tetarteron (Greek: [νόμισμα] τεταρτηρόν, "quarter [coin]") was a Byzantine term applied to two different coins, one gold circulating from the 960s to 1092 in parallel to the histamenon, and one copper used from 1092 to the second half of the 13th century.

== Gold coin ==
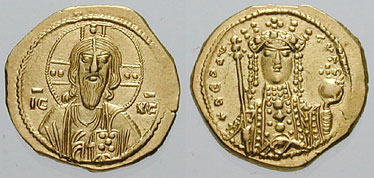
Gold tetarteron of the sole rule of Empress Theodora (r. 1055–1056).

Ever since Emperor Constantine I (r. 306–337), the Byzantine Empire's main coinage had been the high-quality solidus or nomisma, which had remained standard in weight and gold content through the centuries. The Emperor Nikephoros II Phokas (r. 963–969), however, introduced a new coin which was a 2 carats (i.e. about ^{1}/_{12}, despite its name) lighter than the original nomisma, which now became known as the histamenon.

The exact reason for the introduction of the tetarteron is unclear. According to the historian Zonaras, this was done to increase state revenues: the taxes were to be paid as before in the histamenon, while the state paid its own expenses in the less valuable tetarteron, which was officially rated as equal to the full histamenon, instead. Modern scholars have alternatively suggested that the tetarteron was an imitation of the Muslim gold dinar, for use in the eastern provinces recently reconquered from the Arabs, or perhaps an element of an abortive monetary reform that intended to replace the histamenon altogether. At any rate, the tetarteron was issued only in small quantities in the 10th century, and only from the mid-11th century on was it minted in quantity approaching the histamenon.

Initially, the two coins were virtually indistinguishable, except in weight. During the later reign of Basil II (r. 976–1025), the tetarteron began to be minted in a thicker and smaller form, while the histamenon conversely became thinner and wider. Only during the sole rule of Constantine VIII (r. 1025–1028), however, did the two coins become iconographically distinct as well. By the mid-11th century, the tetarteron measured 18 mm wide and its weight apparently standardized at 3.98 grams, i.e. three carats less than the histamenon, which now measured 25 mm in diameter (as opposed to 20 mm for the original solidus) and had acquired a slightly concave (scyphate) form. However, starting with Michael IV (r. 1034–1041), who was a former money lender, the gold content began to be increasingly lowered and the coins debased. After a period of relative stability in circa 1055–1070, the gold content declined dramatically in the period of crisis in the 1070s and 1080s. During the first eleven years of the reign of Alexios I Komnenos (r. 1081–1118), the last gold/electrum tetarterons were issued. Alexios reformed the whole Byzantine coinage in 1092 and eliminated the gold/electrum tetarteron and gold/electrum histamenon. In its place he introduced a new gold coin called the hyperpyron.

== Copper coin ==
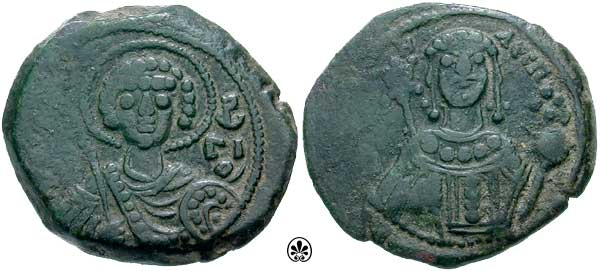
Copper tetarteron of Emperor Manuel I Komnenos (r. 1143–1180).

In 1092, Alexios I Komnenos (r. 1081–1118) reformed the imperial coinage, introducing the hyperpyron gold coin instead of the devalued histamena and tetartera. Alexios also instituted a new copper coinage (although many of the first examples were struck of lead) to replace the old follis. Apparently due to its similar dimensions and fabric to the gold tetarteron, it was also named tetarteron or tarteron. It has, however, also been suggested that its name derives from it being worth one quarter of the late, debased follis of the 1080s. The new coin, flat, weighing circa 4 grams and valued (at least initially) at 864 to the gold hyperpyron, was struck in great quantities and in a large variety of designs, especially in the 12th century. A half-tetarteron was also minted. Both coins remained relatively stable in weight, but begin to appear less frequently towards the turn of the 13th century.

In the 13th century, copper tetartera were issued by the rulers of the Empire of Thessalonica in the 1230s and 1240s, as well as by the Empire of Nicaea (1204–1261). In the restored Byzantine Empire, from 1261 on, they appear to have been replaced by a new type of copper coins named assaria after the ancient Roman coins.

== Sources ==
- Grierson, Philip (1982). Byzantine Coins. London: Methuen. ISBN 978-0-416-71360-2.
- Grierson, Philip (1999). Byzantine Coinage (PDF). Washington, DC: Dumbarton Oaks. ISBN 978-0-88402-274-9. Archived from the original (PDF) on 2016-03-03.
- Hendy, Michael F. (1985). Studies in the Byzantine Monetary Economy c. 300–1450. Cambridge: Cambridge University Press. ISBN 0-521-24715-2.
- Kazhdan, Alexander, ed. (1991). The Oxford Dictionary of Byzantium. Oxford and New York: Oxford University Press. ISBN 978-0-19-504652-6.
- Димов, Г. Провалите и фалшификациите във византийската монетна политика през X век. Появата на тетартерон и диотетартетон номизма. - В: Mediaevalia, 3, 2011, 237-245.
