= Byzantine coinage =

Currency

Byzantine currency, money used in the Eastern Roman Empire after the fall of the West, consisted of mainly two types of coins: gold solidi and hyperpyra and a variety of clearly valued bronze coins. By the 15th century, the currency was issued only in debased silver stavrata and minor copper coins with no gold issue. The Byzantine Empire established and operated several mints throughout its history. Aside from the main metropolitan mint in the capital, Constantinople, a varying number of provincial mints were also established in other urban centres, especially during the 6th century.

Most provincial mints except for Syracuse were closed or lost to Arab Muslim invasions in the Mediterranean Region by the mid-7th century onwards. After the loss of Syracuse in 878, Constantinople became the sole mint for gold and silver coinage until the late 11th century, when major provincial mints began to re-appear. Many mints, both imperial and, as the Byzantine Empire fragmented, belonging to autonomous local rulers, were operated in the 12th to 14th centuries. Constantinople and Trebizond, capital of the independent Empire of Trebizond (1204–1461), survived until the invasion of Anatolia by the Ottoman Turks in the mid-15th century.

== Iconography ==
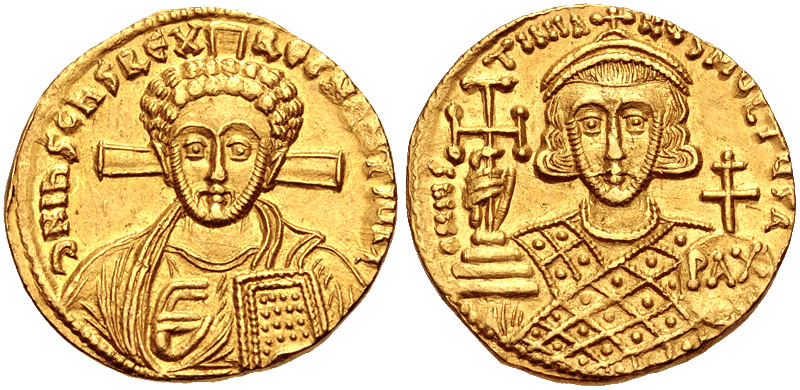
Solidus minted during the second reign of Justinian II (705–711)

Early Byzantine coins continue the late Greco-Roman conventions: on the obverse the head of the Roman Emperor, now full face rather than in profile; (Note: The front-facing variant was introduced by Maxentius and was also used by Constantine, Licinius and Constantius II before becoming the standard portrait in the East, although it was also used to a lesser extent in the West.) on the reverse, usually a Christian symbol such as the cross or an angel (the two tending to merge into one another). Justin I replaced the pagan depictions of Roman goddess Victoria on the reverse of his gold coinage with the Archangel Michael, showing the growing devotion towards him and Christianity in the 6th century Roman world. The gold coins of Justinian II departed from these stable conventions by putting a bust of Christ on the obverse, (Note: The first portrait of Christ to appear on a coin may be on a gold solidus of Emperor Marcian (r. 450-457). The coin appears to depict Christ bestowing a blessing on the Emperor of the East and his Empress, Aelia Pulcheria. But such images of Christ were far from popular until many years later.) and a half or full-length portrait of the Emperor on the reverse. These innovations incidentally had the effect of leading the Umayyad caliph ʿAbd al-Malik, who had previously copied Byzantine styles but replacing Christian symbols with Islamic equivalents, finally to develop a distinctive Islamic style, with only lettering on both sides. This was then used on nearly all Islamic coinage until the modern period.

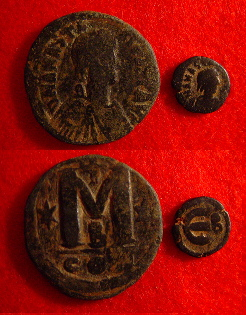
Anastasius 40 nummi (M) and 5 nummi (E)

The type of Justinian II was revived after the end of iconoclasm, and with variations remained the norm until the end of the Empire. In the 10th century, so-called "anonymous folles" were struck instead of the earlier coins depicting the emperor. The anonymous folles featured the bust of Christ on the obverse and the inscription "XRISTUS/bASILEU/bASILE", which translates to "Christ, Emperor of Emperors".

Byzantine coins followed, and took to the furthest extreme, the tendency of precious metal coinage to get thinner and wider as time goes on. Late Byzantine gold coins became thin wafers that could be bent by hand. The Byzantine coinage had a prestige that lasted until near the end of the Empire. European rulers, once they again started issuing their own coins, tended to follow a simplified version of Byzantine patterns, with full face ruler portraits on the obverse.

== Denominations ==
The start of what is viewed as Byzantine currency by numismatics began with the monetary reform of Anastasius I in 498, who reformed the late Roman Empire coinage system which consisted of the gold solidus and the bronze nummi. The nummus was an extremely small bronze coin, at about 8–10 mm, weight of 0.56 g making it at 576 to the Roman pound which was inconvenient because a large number of them were required even for small transactions.

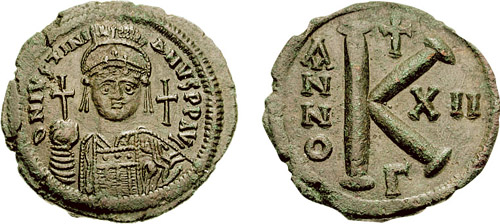
Justinian I half-follis, 20 nummi. Note the K on the reverse.

New bronze coins, multiples of the nummus were introduced, such as the 40 nummi (also known as the follis), 20 nummi (also known as a half-follis), 10 nummi (also known as the decanummium, and 5 nummi coins (also known as the pentanummium); other denominations were occasionally produced. The obverse (front) of these coins featured a highly stylized portrait of the emperor while the reverse (back) featured the value of the denomination represented according to the Greek numbering system (M=40, Λ=30, K=20, I=10, E=5). Silver coins were rarely produced.

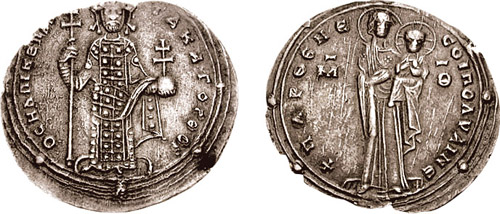
Romanus III miliaresion.

The only regularly issued silver coin was the hexagram first issued by Heraclius in 615 which lasted until the end of the 7th century, minted in varying fineness with a weight generally between 7.5 and 8.5 grams. It was succeeded by the initially ceremonial miliaresion established by Leo III the Isaurian in ca. 720, which became standard issue from ca. 830 on and until the late 11th century, when it was discontinued after being severely debased. Small transactions were conducted with bronze coinage throughout this period.

The gold solidus or nomisma remained a standard of international commerce until the 11th century, when it began to be debased under successive emperors beginning in the 1030s under the emperor Romanos III Argyros (1028–1034). Until that time, the fineness of the gold remained consistent at about 0.955–0.980.

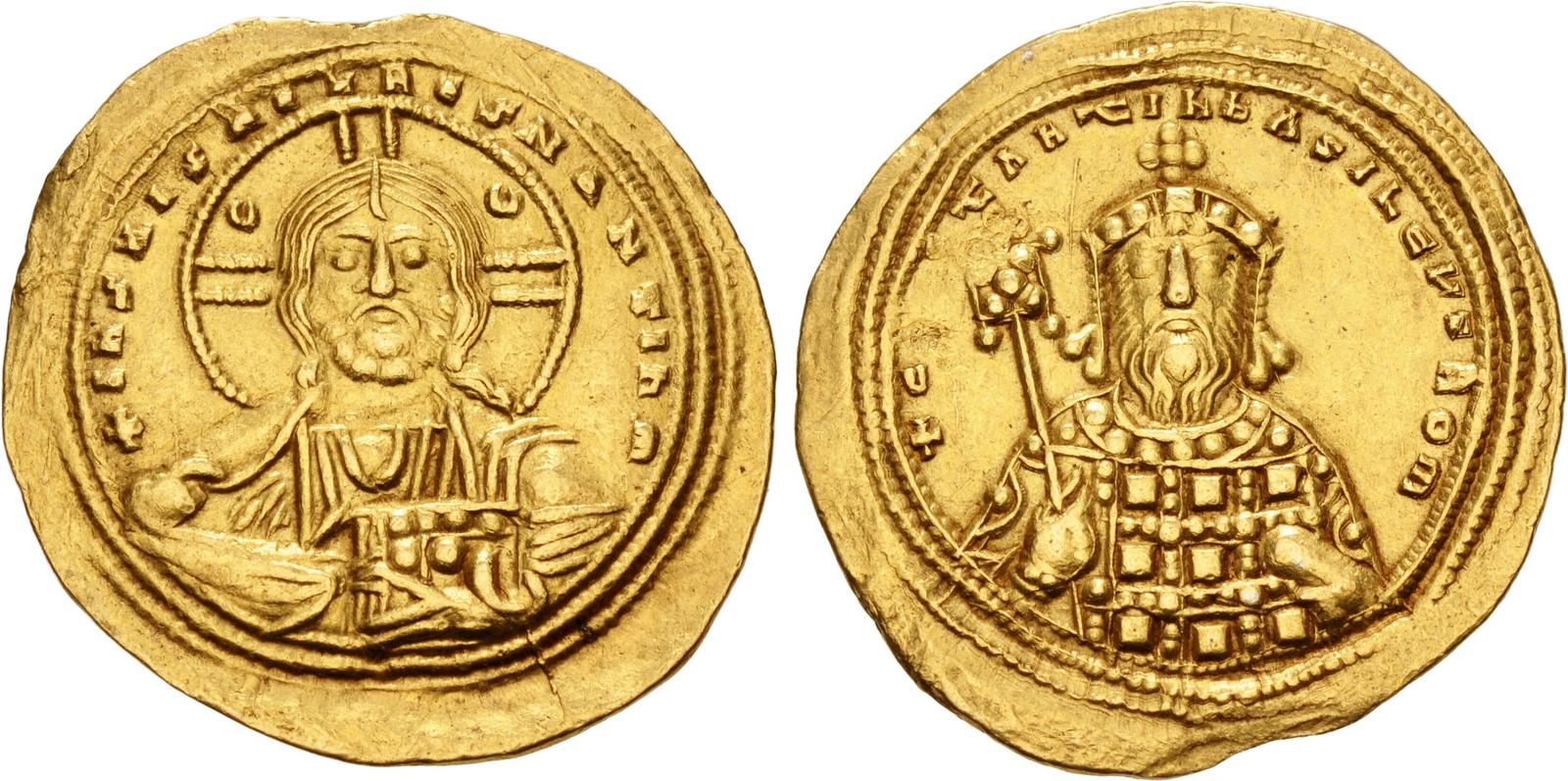
Histamenon by Constantine VIII.

The Byzantine monetary system changed during the 7th century when the 40 nummi (also known as the follis), now significantly smaller, became the only bronze coin to be regularly issued. Although Constantine IV attempted a restoration of the follis size of Justinian I, the follis, his reform was promptly abandoned after his death and folles continued to decrease in size.

In the early 9th century, a three-fourths-weight solidus was issued in parallel with a full-weight solidus, both preserving the standard of fineness, under a failed plan to force the market to accept the underweight coins at the value of the full weight coins. The ^{11}/_{12} weight coin was called a tetarteron (a Greek comparative adjective, literally "fourth-er"), and the full weight solidus was called the histamenon. The tetarteron was unpopular and was only sporadically reissued during the 10th century. The full weight solidus was struck at 72 to the Roman pound, roughly 4.48 grams in weight. There were also solidi of weight reduced by one siliqua issued for trade with the Near East. These reduced solidi, with a star both on obverse and reverse, weighed about 4.25 g.

The Byzantine solidus was valued in Western Europe, where it became known as the bezant, a corruption of Byzantium. The term bezant then became the name for the heraldic symbol of a roundel, tincture or – i.e. a gold disc.

== Alexius I reforms ==
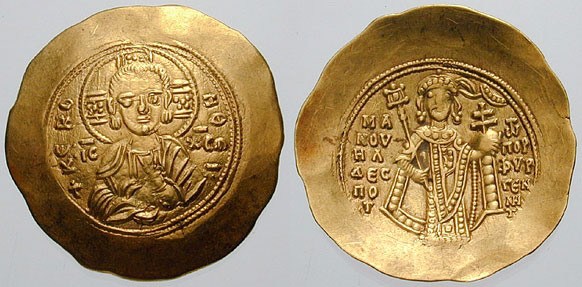
Manuel I Comnenus scyphate (cup-shaped) hyperpyron.

Former money changer Michael IV the Paphlagonian (1034–41) assumed the throne of Byzantium in 1034 and began the slow process of debasing both the tetarteron nomisma and the histamenon nomisma. The debasement was gradual at first, but then accelerated rapidly. about 21 carats (87.5% pure) during the reign of Constantine IX (1042–1055), 18 carats (75%) under Constantine X (1059–1067), 16 carats (66.7%) under Romanus IV (1068–1071), 14 carats (58%) under Michael VII (1071–1078), 8 carats (33%) under Nicephorus III (1078–1081) and 0 to 8 carats during the first eleven years of the reign of Alexius I (1081–1118). Under Alexius I Comnenus (1081–1118) the debased solidus (tetarteron and histamenon) was discontinued and a gold coinage of higher fineness (generally .900-.950) was established, in 1092, commonly called the hyperpyron at 4.45 grs. The hyperpyron was slightly smaller than the solidus.

It was introduced along with the electrum aspron trachy worth a third of a hyperpyron and about 25% gold and 75% silver, the billon aspron trachy or stamenon valued at 48 to the hyperpyron and with 7% silver wash and the copper tetarteron and noummion worth 18 and 36 to the billon aspron trachy.

== Andronicus II reforms ==
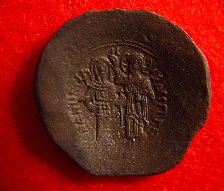
Billon trachy of Andronicus I, 12th century

During Andronicus II's reign he instituted new denominations based on the hyperpyron. They were the silver miliaresion or basilika at 12 to the hyperpyron and the billon politika at 96 per hyperpyron, along with the copper assaria, tournesia and follara. The basilikon was a copy of the Venetian ducat and circulated from 1304 for fifty years.

The hyperpyron remained in regular issue and circulation until the 1350s, remaining in use thereafter only as a money of account. After 1400, Byzantine coinage became insignificant, as Italian money became the predominant circulating coinage.

These scyphate (cup-shaped) coins known as trachy were issued in both electrum (debased gold) and billon (debased silver). The exact reason for such coins is not known, although it is usually theorized that they were shaped for easier stacking.

== 1367 reform ==
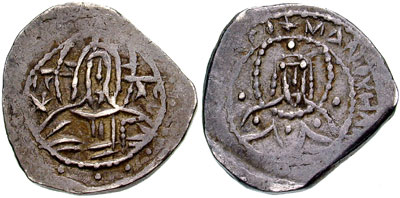
Half stavraton issued by Manuel II Palaeologus in 1391–1423.

During this last phase of Byzantine coinage gold issues were discontinued and a regular silver issue was commenced. The denomination was the Stavraton issued in 1, 1/2, 1/8 and 1/16 stavraton. Also issued were the copper follaro and tornesse.

== Buying power ==
It is possible to get some small snapshots in time, specific to region, culture and local inflation. The literary world is littered with references to prices from different time frames. A good portion of them may be inaccurate or tainted by translation.

At Jerusalem in the sixth century a building worker received 1/20 solidus per day, that is 21 folles. A casual labourer at Alexandria in the early seventh century earned 1/23 solidus. A family's vegetable allowance for one day cost 5 folles. A pound of fish 6 folles, a loaf of bread was 3 folles worth at a time of shortage. The cheapest blanket was worth 1/4 solidus, a second-hand cloak 1 solidus, and a donkey 3 or 4 solidi.

== Relative values ==
Anastasius I(after. 495)
	Solidi	Folles	Half folles	Decanummia	Pentanummia	Nummi
Solidus	1	420	840	1680	3360	16,800
Follis	1/420	1	2	4	8	40
Half follis	1/840	1/2	1	2	4	20
Decanummium	1/1680	1/4	1/2	1	2	10
Pentanummium	1/3360	1/8	1/4	1/2	1	5
Nummus	1/16,800	1/40	1/20	1/10	1/5	1

== See also ==
- Bezant
- Economic history of Greece and the Greek world
- Grosso
- Japanese mon
- Medieval Bulgarian coinage
- Medieval Serbian coinage
- Roman currency
- Sasanian coinage

== Sources ==
- Grierson, Philip (1982), Byzantine coins, Taylor & Francis, ISBN 978-0-416-71360-2
- Grierson, Philip (1999), Byzantine coinage (PDF), Dumbarton Oaks, ISBN 978-0-88402-274-9
- Hendy, Michael F. (1985), Studies in the Byzantine Monetary Economy c.300–1450, Cambridge University Press, ISBN 0-521-24715-2
- Kazhdan, Alexander, ed. (1991), Oxford Dictionary of Byzantium, Oxford University Press, ISBN 978-0-19-504652-6
