= Histamenon =

Byzantine coin

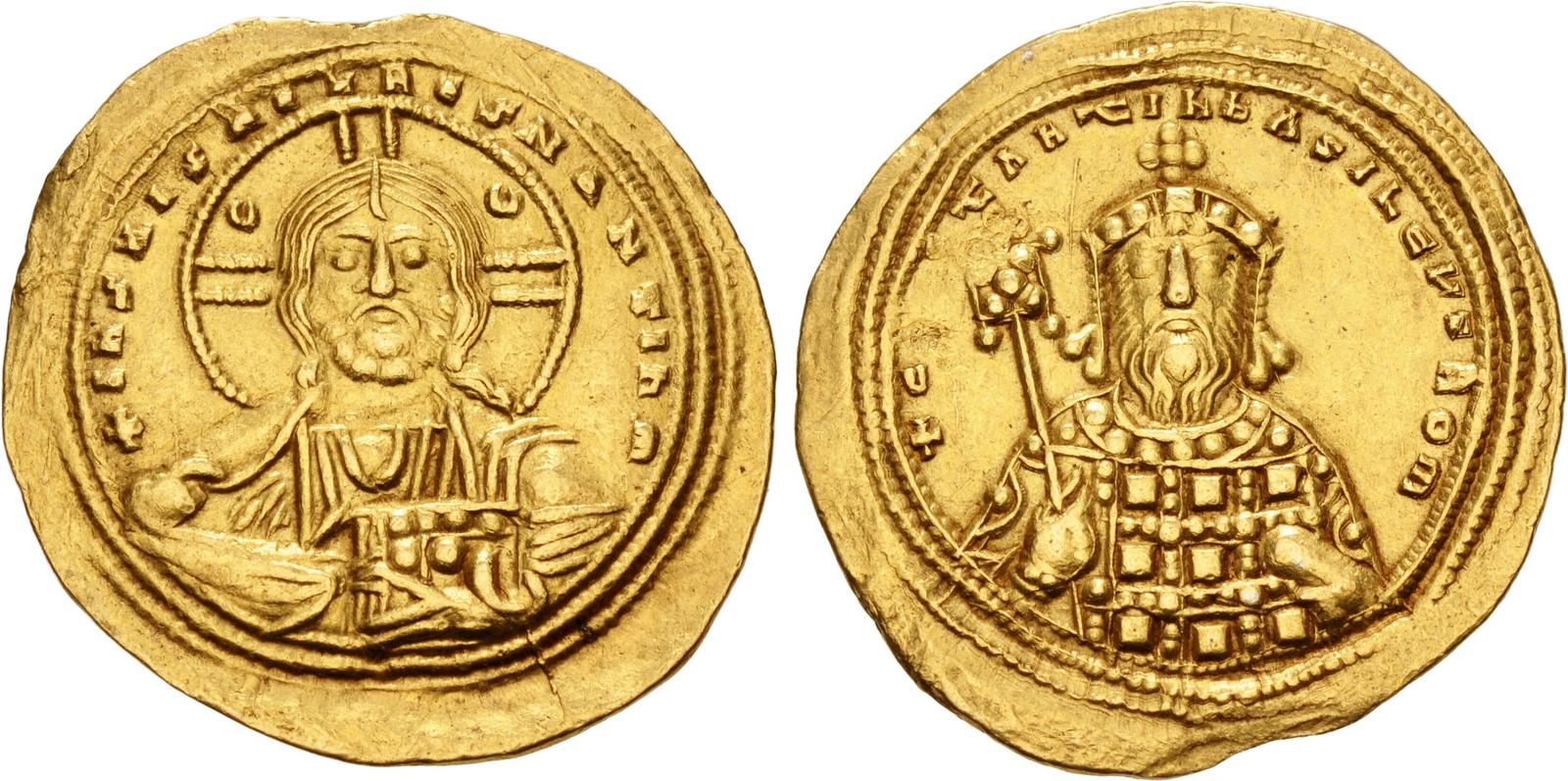
Histamenon of Emperor Constantine VIII (r. 1025–1028)

Histamenon (Greek: ἱστάμενον [νόμισμα], histámenon [nómisma] lit. 'standard coin') was the name given to the gold Byzantine solidus when the slightly lighter tetarteron was introduced in the 960s. To distinguish the two, the histamenon was changed in form from the original solidus, becoming wider and thinner, as well as concave (scyphate) in form. Later usually shortened to stamenon (Greek: στάμενον), it was discontinued after 1092. In the 12th and 13th centuries, the name stamenon came to be applied to the concave billon and copper trachea coins.

== Establishment ==
Ever since Emperor Constantine I (r. 306–337) introduced it in 309, the Byzantine Empire's main coinage had been the high-quality solidus or nomisma, which had remained standard in weight (4.45 grams) and gold content (24 carats) through the centuries. Emperor Nikephoros II Phokas (r. 963–969), however, introduced a new coin, the [nomisma] tetarteron ("quarter [coin]") which was 2 carats (i.e. about ^{1}/_{12}, despite its name) lighter than the original nomisma. The latter now became known as the histamenon, from the Greek verb ἵστημι, "to stand up", implying that these followed the traditional standard. The reasons for this change are not clear; Byzantine chroniclers, however, suggest fiscal motives, reporting that Nikephoros collected the taxes as before in the histamenon while paying back with the tetarteron, which was officially rated as equal in value to the full-weight coin.

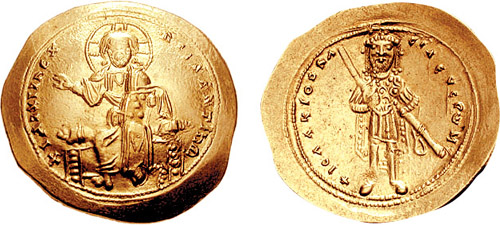
Histamenon of Emperor Isaac I Komnenos (r. 1057–1059), with its by then characteristic concave form

Initially, the two coins were virtually indistinguishable except in weight. During the later reign of Basil II (r. 976–1025), the tetarteron began to be minted in a thicker and smaller form, while the histamenon became correspondingly thinner and wider. Only during the sole rule of Constantine VIII (r. 1025–1028) did the two coins become iconographically distinct as well. By the mid-11th century, the tetarteron measured 18 mm wide and its weight apparently standardized at 3.98 grams, i.e. three carats less than the histamenon or stamenon (a name first attested in 1030), which now measured 25 mm in diameter (as opposed to 20 mm for the original solidus). In addition, under Michael IV the Paphlagonian (r. 1034–1041), it began to be minted in a slightly concave (scyphate) form, possibly to increase the thin coin's strength and to make it less easily bent. Flat coins were still struck at times, but scyphate ones came to predominate from Constantine IX (r. 1042–1055) on and became standard under Isaac I Komnenos (r. 1057–1059). These concave coins were known as histamena trachea or simply trachea (τραχέα, "rough, uneven") from their shape.

== Debasement and abolition ==
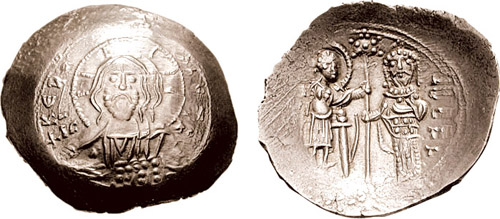
An example of the greatly debased later histamena: an electrum coin of the first years of Emperor Alexios I Komnenos (r. 1081–1118).

Starting with Michael IV, who was a former money lender, the gold content began to be increasingly lowered and the coins debased. After a period of relative stability in c. 1055–1070, the gold content declined dramatically in the disastrous 1070s and 1080s. The michaelata of Michael VII Doukas (r. 1071–1078) still contained some 16 carats of gold, but by the time of Alexios I Komnenos (r. 1081–1118), the nomismata struck contained almost no gold at all. Thus, in 1092, Alexios I carried out a comprehensive monetary reform, replacing among others the debased gold coins, both the histamenon and the tetarteron, with a new high-quality gold issue, the hyperpyron.

Henceforth, and for the duration of the Komnenian monetary system (12th–13th centuries), the term stamenon, due to its association with scyphate coins, came to be applied as a blanket term to the similarly concave billon and copper coins (trachea) issued by the Byzantine Empire.

== Sources ==
- Grierson, Philip (1982). Byzantine Coins. London, United Kingdom: Methuen. ISBN 978-0-416-71360-2.
- Grierson, Philip (1999). Byzantine Coinage (PDF). Washington, District of Columbia: Dumbarton Oaks. ISBN 978-0-88402-274-9. Archived from the original (PDF) on 2010-06-13.
- Hendy, Michael F. (1985). Studies in the Byzantine Monetary Economy c. 300–1450. Cambridge, United Kingdom: Cambridge University Press. ISBN 0-521-24715-2.
- Kazhdan, Alexander, ed. (1991). The Oxford Dictionary of Byzantium. Oxford and New York: Oxford University Press. ISBN 0-19-504652-8.
