= Michaelaton =

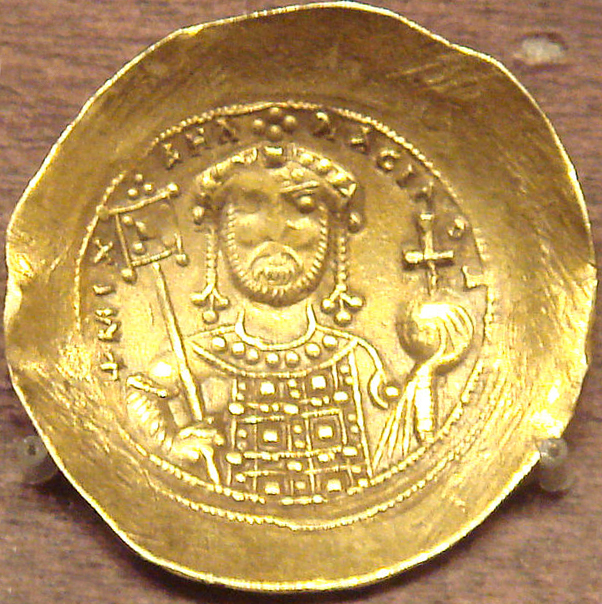
Michaelaton (histamenon) of Michael VII.

The michaelaton (Greek: νόμισμα μιχαηλᾶτον, "coin of Michael"), in Latin michaelatus, was the colloquial name given to the gold Byzantine coins (nomismata) struck by any emperor called Michael.

In a more technical sense, it refers to the gold histamena issued by Emperor Michael IV the Paphlagonian (r. 1034–1041) and, in sources of the late 11th and the 12th centuries, for those of Emperor Michael VII Doukas (r. 1071–1078), whose gold coinage was the last to retain a reasonably high amount of gold (16 carats) before the massive debasement that followed under his successors. It was in widespread use in Italy, especially the south, because it was virtually equal to the popular Sicilian tarì.

== Sources ==
- Kazhdan, Alexander, ed. (1991), Oxford Dictionary of Byzantium, Oxford University Press, p. 1368, ISBN 978-0-19-504652-6
