= Stavraton =

Byzantine silver coin

The stavraton or stauraton (Byzantine Greek: σταυράτον) was a type of silver coin used during the last century of the Byzantine Empire.

== History ==
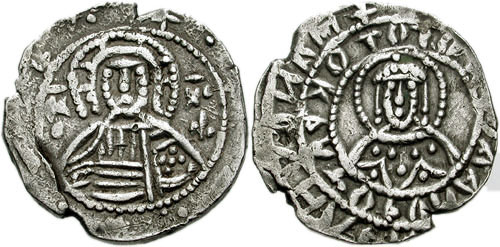
Stavraton of the Emperor Manuel II Palaiologos (r. 1391–1425).

The name stavraton first appears in the mid-11th century for a gold histamenon showing the Byzantine emperor holding a cross-shaped scepter, but in its more specific sense, it denotes the large silver coins introduced by Emperor John V Palaiologos (r. 1341–1376, 1379–1391– ) in c. 1367 and used for the last century of Byzantine history. The late Byzantine coin was probably named after the cross (σταυρός, stavros/stauros) that featured in its presumed model, the double gigliato of Naples and the Provence; alternatively, the name may have derived from the small crosses at the beginning of the coins' inscriptions, an unusual feature for Byzantine currency, although these are not very conspicuous.

The coin was designed to replace the defunct gold hyperpyron as the highest-denomination coin in circulation. Hence it was made heavier than any previous Byzantine silver coin, or, for that matter, any contemporary European coin, weighing initially 8.5 grams but falling later to 7.4 grams. It still had only half the value of the hyperpyron however, which remained in use as a notional currency.

The stavraton was complemented by fractions of 1/2 and 1/8, both in silver. The half-stavraton initially weighed 4.4 grams and gradually declined to 3.7; the one-eighth, known as the doukatopoulon (δουκατόπουλον, 'little ducat', duchatelo in Italian sources) or aspron (ἄσπρον) weighed c. 1.1 grams. Quarter-stavrata were not minted, and the silver Venetian ducats (δουκάτον, doukaton) were used instead.

All these coins featured a bust of Christ on the obverse and an imperial bust on the reverse. The inscriptions are fairly uniform, with the reverse featuring an inner and an outer inscription: "+[Emperor's name] Δεϲπότηϲ ο Παλεολόγοϲ / Θ[εό]ν Χάριτι Βαϲιλεύϲ Ῥωμαίων", i.e. "Lord (despotes) [Emperor's name] the Palaiologos / by God's Grace, Emperor (Basileus) of the Romans". In the stavrata of John V's reign, the inscriptions were in reverse order, and under Manuel II, the inner inscription used the term Autokrator instead: "Θ[εό]ν Χάριτι Αὐτοκράτωρ". Until 1990, when a hoard of 90 coins appeared, and with the exception of two half-stavrata, no silver coins of the last Byzantine emperor, Constantine XI (r. 1449–1453– ), were known to have survived.

== Sources ==
- Grierson, Philip (1999). Byzantine Coinage (PDF). Washington, DC: Dumbarton Oaks. ISBN 978-0-88402-274-9. Archived from the original (PDF) on 2010-06-13.
- Hendy, Michael F. (1985). Studies in the Byzantine Monetary Economy c. 300–1450. Cambridge: Cambridge University Press. ISBN 0-521-24715-2.
- Kazhdan, Alexander, ed. (1991). The Oxford Dictionary of Byzantium. New York and Oxford: Oxford University Press. ISBN 978-0-19-504652-6.
