= Miliarense =

Late Roman silver coin

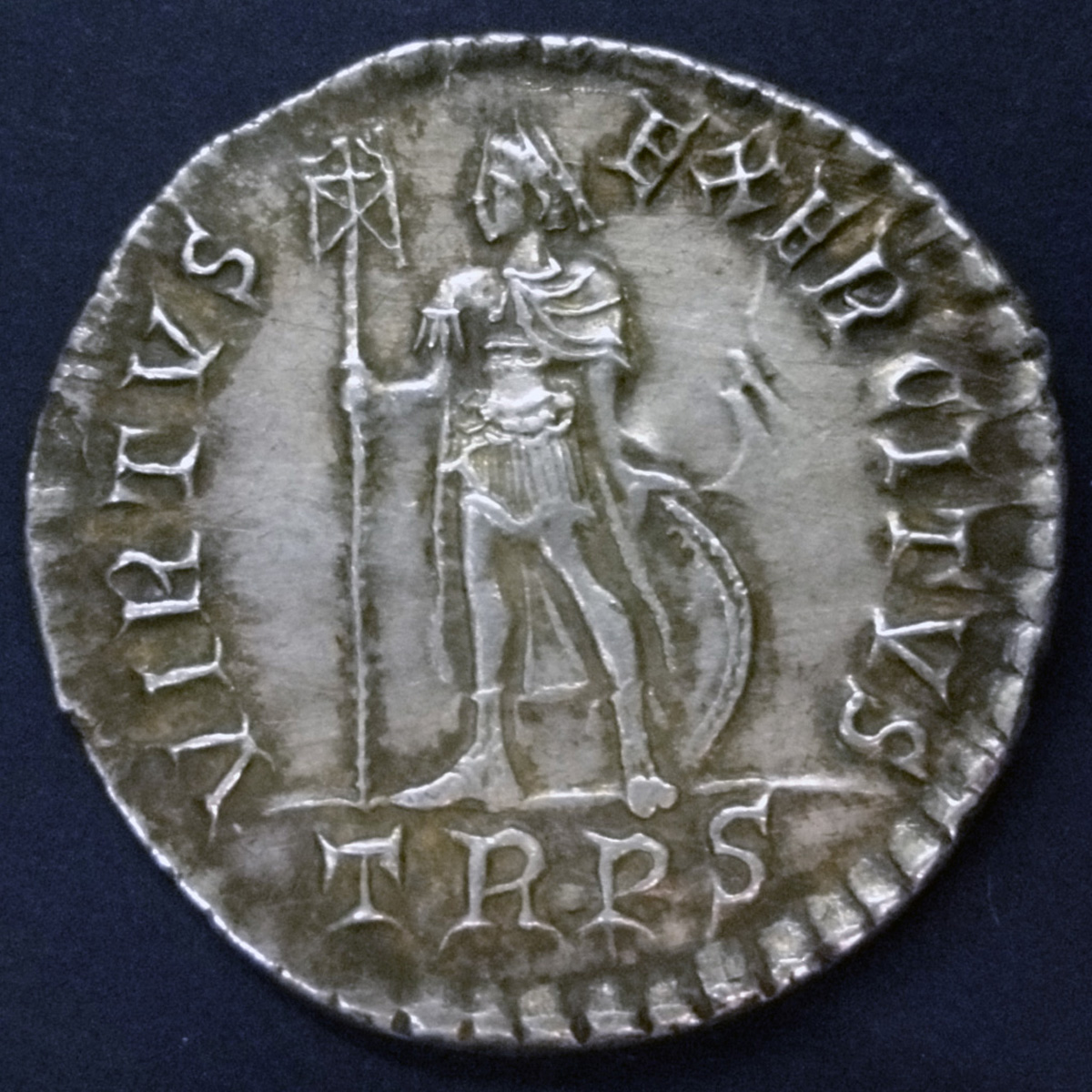
Reverse of a miliarense from the Hoxne Hoard. TRPS indicates the mint of Treveri (modern Trier, Germany).

The miliarense (neuter form of the late Latin miliarensis, "pertaining to a thousand"; plural: miliarensia) was a large silver coin, introduced to the late Roman monetary system in the early 4th century. It was struck with variable fineness, generally with a weight between 3.8 and 6.0 grams, and a diameter of c. 23–24 mm. The miliarense was struck first under Constantine the Great (r. 306–337).

There were two kinds of miliarense coins: light and heavy. It took 14 heavy miliarensia and 18 light miliarensia to equal one gold solidus (as also introduced by Constantine). Miliarensia are highly desired by numismatists of the present day, due to both the rarity of the denomination (far less common than the siliqua) and the often exquisite execution of both bust and reverse types, which led to many being used as pendants or mounted in antiquity.

A variant of the original denomination was revived in the Byzantine silver coinage from the 8th to the 11th centuries (see miliaresion).

== See also ==
- Roman currency
- Byzantine coinage
