= Medieval Serbian coinage =

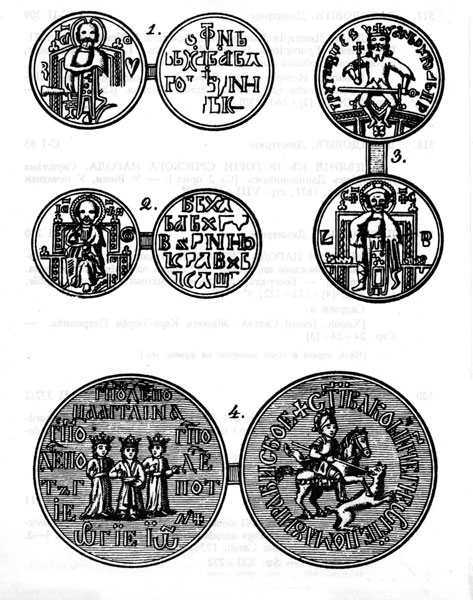
Examples of Serbian dinars.

The first mention of a Serbian dinar was in the reign of Stefan Nemanjić in 1214. Until the fall of the Serbian Despotate in 1459, most of the Serbian rulers minted silver dinar coins.

Emperor Stefan Dušan adopted the Byzantine hyperpyron (perper), a large unit of currency: the imperial tax was one perper per year per house.

The first Serbian dinars, like many other Southern European coins, replicated Venetian grosso, including characters in Latin (the word dux replaced with the word rex). For many years it was one of the main export articles of medieval Serbia, considering the relative abundance of silver coming from Serbian mines. While multiple foreign currencies circulated medieval Serbia, medieval dinar nevertheless maintained stable value from early thirteen till the mid fourteen century when 24 dinars were exchanged for 1 gold coin ducat. Venetians were weary of this, and Dante Alighieri put the Serbian king of his time, Stefan Milutin, in Hell as a forger.

In 1435 Despot of Serbia Đurađ Branković carried out monetary reform which devaluated the exchange rate to 35-40 dinars for 1 Venetian ducat

== Gallery ==
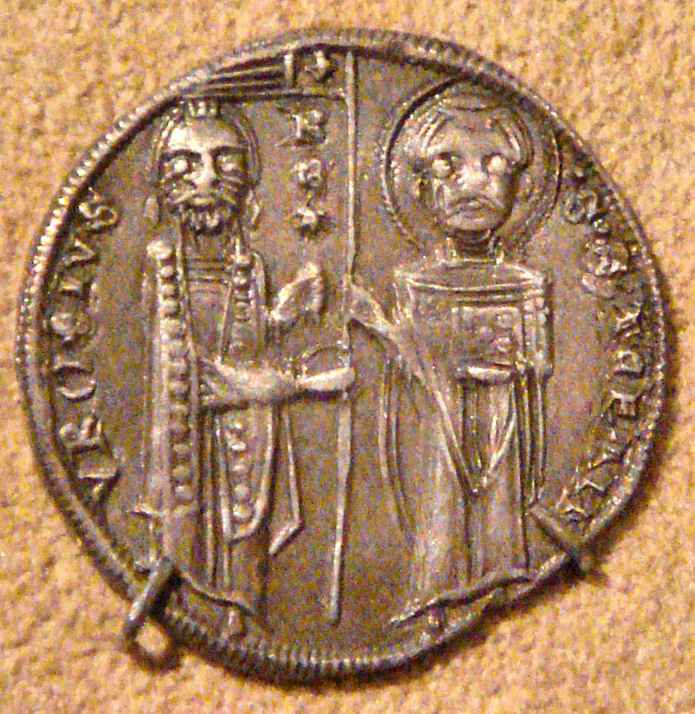
Dinar of Stefan Uroš I (r. 1243–1276).

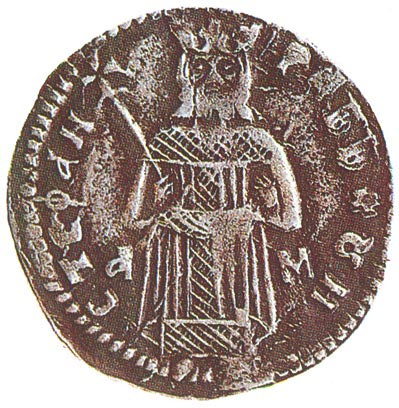
Dinar of King Stefan Dragutin (r. 1276–1282).

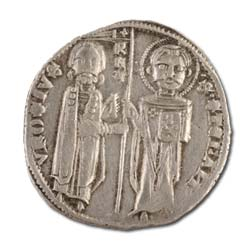
Dinar of King Stefan Milutin (r. 1282–1321).

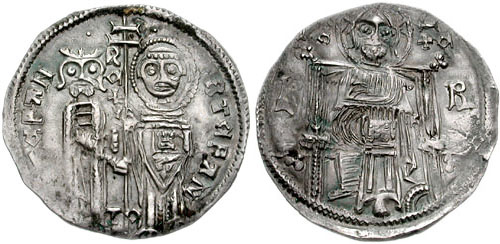
Dinars of King Stefan Uroš III (r. 1321–1331).

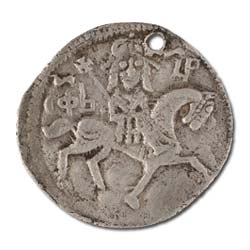
Dinar of Emperor Stefan Dušan (r. 1331–1355).

== See also ==
- Serbian dinar
- Medieval Bulgarian coinage

== Sources ==
- Ćirković, Sima (2004). The Serbs. Malden: Blackwell Publishing. ISBN 9781405142915.
- Cvjetićanin, Tatjana, ed. (2008) [2003–2004]. "Numizmatičar". 26–27. Belgrade: National Museum.
- Sergije Dimitrijević (1997). Srednjovekovni srpski novac. SANU. ISBN 9788617060686.
- Dejan Djokić (2023). A Concise History of Serbia. Cambridge University Press. ISBN 978-1-107-02838-8.
- Ivanišević, Vujadin (2001). Новчарство средњовековне Србије. Belgrade.
- Miroslav M. Jovanović (2012). Srpski srednjovekovni novac. Miroslav Jovanović. ISBN 978-86-902415-3-8.
- Kovačević-Kojić, Desanka (2014). "On the Composition and Processing of Precious Metals mined in Medieval Serbia" (PDF). Balcanica (45): 97–106. doi:10.2298/BALC1445097K.
- Vesna Radić (1994). Eight Centuries of the Serbian Dinar: Medieval Coins. Belgrade: National Museum.
- Marija Jovanović (1990). Srpski srednjovekovni novac. Fotograf.
- Odak, Marina I. (2015). "Ikonografija i simbolika predstava na srpskom srednjovekovnom novcu". Belgrade: Filozofski fakultet.
