= Bezantée =

Ornamentation consisting of roundels

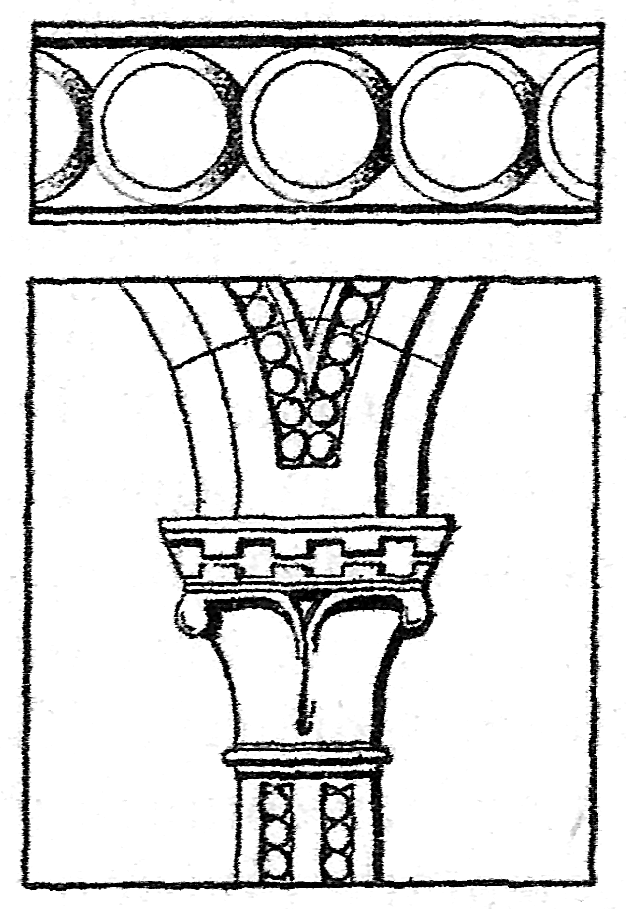
Bezantée moulding showing the use of the disc as a decoration for a Romanesque pier and arcade

Bezantée, bezantie or bezanty is an ornamentation consisting of roundels. The word derives from bezant, a gold coin from the Byzantine Empire, which was in common European use until circa 1250.

In architecture, bezantée moulding was much used in the Norman period.

In heraldry the word is shorthand for semé of bezants, i.e. strewn (literally "seeded") with bezants. A bezant is a roundel whose tincture is or. In English heraldry, a field sable bezanty often alludes to the Duchy of Cornwall. An ounce (leopard) bezanty appears as a supporter in the English bearings of St Edmundsbury Borough Council; a bordure bezanty appears in the coat of Berkhamstead Town Council.
