= Hyperpyron =

Late Byzantine coin

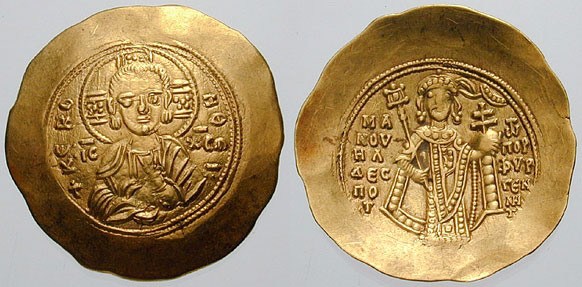
Hyperpyron of Emperor Manuel I Komnenos (r. 1143–1180), showing its typical scyphate (cup-shaped) form.

The hyperpyron (Greek: νόμισμα ὑπέρπυρον, nómisma hypérpyron lit. 'highly refined coin') was a Byzantine coin in use during the late Middle Ages, replacing the solidus as the Byzantine Empire's standard gold coinage in the 11th century. It was introduced by emperor Alexios I Komnenos.

== History ==
The traditional gold currency of the Byzantine Empire had been the solidus or nomisma, whose gold content had remained steady at 24 carats for seven centuries and was consequently highly prized. From the 1030s, however, the coin was increasingly debased, until in the 1080s, following the military disasters and civil wars of the previous decade, its gold content was reduced to almost zero. Consequently, in 1092, Emperor Alexios I Komnenos (r. 1081–1118) undertook a drastic overhaul of the Byzantine coinage system and introduced a new gold coin, the hyperpyron (meaning "super-refined"). This was of the same standard weight (4.45 grams) as the solidus, but only 20.5 carat purity (0.854 fineness) instead of the standard 24 carat, resulting in a reduced gold content of only 4.1 grams instead of 4.8 grams. The lower purity was due to melting down and inclusion of earlier debased coins.

The hyperpyron remained the standard gold coin until gold coins ceased to be minted by the Byzantines in the mid-14th century. It too, however, was subject to gradual debasement: under the Empire of Nicaea (1204–1261), its gold content fell gradually to 18 carats, under Michael VIII Palaiologos (r. 1259–1282) to 15 and under his son and successor Andronikos II Palaiologos (r. 1282–1328) to 12 carats. At the same time, the quality of the coins declined as well, and in the 14th century, their weight was far from uniform. The last hyperpyra, and thus the last Byzantine gold coins, were struck by Emperor John VI Kantakouzenos (r. 1347–1352). The name remained in use thereafter solely as a money of account, divided into 24 keratia.

The name was adopted in various forms by Western Europeans (Latin: perperum, Italian: perpero) and the Slavic countries of the Balkans (perper, iperpero, etc.) designating various coins, usually silver, as well as moneys of account. More often in the West the hyperpyron was called the bezant, especially among Italian merchants.

In the early Komnenian period, the hyperpyron was the equivalent of three electrum trachea, 48 billon trachea or 864 copper tetartera, although with the debasement of the trachea it eventually came to rate 12 electrum trachea and 288 to 384 billon trachea. In the 14th century, the hyperpyron equalled 12 of the new silver basilika, 96 tournesia, 384 copper trachea and 768 copper assaria.

== See also ==
- Medieval Bulgarian coinage
- Montenegrin perper
- Ragusan perpera
- Serbian perper

== General and cited sources ==
- Grierson, Philip (1999). Byzantine Coinage. Washington, DC: Dumbarton Oaks. ISBN 978-0-88402-274-9. Archived from the original on 2013-12-14.
- Kazhdan, Alexander, ed. (1991). The Oxford Dictionary of Byzantium. New York and Oxford: Oxford University Press. ISBN 978-0-19-504652-6.
