= Trachy (coin) =

Type of Byzantine coin

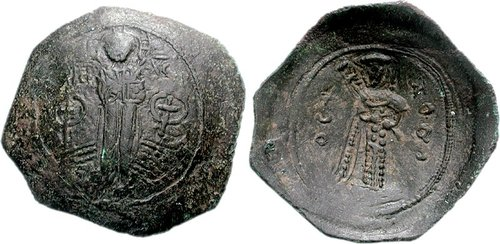
Aspron trachy minted by the usurper Theodore Mankaphas

The term trachy (Greek: τραχύ), plural trachea (τραχέα), meaning "rough" or "uneven," was used to describe the cup-shaped (incorrectly often called "scyphate") Byzantine coins struck in the 11th–14th centuries. The term was properly applied to coins of electrum, billon, or copper, but not to the gold hyperpyra. The coin was devalued as the alloy mixture had less silver over time.

During the short lifespan of the feudal Crusader state, the Latin Empire of Constantinople (1204–1261) also used the trachy.

== Value ==
The value of the trachy was closely tied to its silver content, which declined progressively over time. In 1136, the coin contained approximately 6.0% to 7.0% silver and was valued at 1/48 of a gold hyperpyron. By 1199, the silver content had fallen to around 2.5% to 3.0%, reducing its value to 1/120 of a hyperpyron. Eventually, with silver content as low as 2.0% to 3.0%, the trachy was worth only 1/184 of a hyperpyron.

== Sources ==
- Kazhdan, Alexander, ed. (1991). The Oxford Dictionary of Byzantium. Oxford and New York: Oxford University Press. ISBN 978-0-19-504652-6.
