= Medieval Bulgarian coinage =

A gold coin of Emperor Ivan Asen II.

Medieval Bulgarian coinage were the coins minted by the Bulgarian Emperors during the Middle Ages at the time of the Second Bulgarian Empire.

The first Bulgarian coins were minted during the First Bulgarian Empire with the earliest one linked to the Bulgarian ruler Peter I from 10th century. Minting ceased after the fall of the Second Empire with Ottoman domination in 1396. They were gold (perperi), silver (aspri), billon (coinage of silver and copper) and copper coins, all flat and hollow. The inscriptions were usually in Bulgarian language and rarely in Greek. Due to the limited space the inscriptions were abbreviated, often written with a few letters and special signs. Artistically, they continued the Byzantine numismatic tradition but the designs were often more schematic. The main means of expression were lines and dots. The Bulgarian coins had images different from the Byzantine and Slav coinage, so they form a distinct group. The coins are an important source for the history of the Second Bulgarian Empire.

== Ivan Asen II ==
Tsar Ivan Asen II (1218–1241) is the first Bulgarian ruler from whose reign coins are preserved. It is known that his predecessors Kaloyan (1197–1207) and Boril (1207–1218) minted imitations of Byzantine coins. Although Kaloyan was given the right to mint coins by Pope Innocent III (and Boril inherited the right from him), there are no surviving coins of theirs, and historians assume that Ivan Asen II was the first ruler to actually mint coins.

- Gold perpera - It is the only surviving gold coin, not only of a medieval Bulgarian monarch, but also of any Slavonic ruler of the period. One example was found in 1934 among other coins in the area of Prilep (contemporary North Macedonia). It is now in the National Archaeological Museum of the Bulgarian Academy of Sciences. Its weight is 4.33 g, the diameter is 33 mm, and it is made of 16 carat gold. The shape is slightly hollow. On one side Ivan Asen II and Saint Demetrius of Thessaloniki are depicted upright. With one of his hands the Saint gives the Emperor a sword and with the other he is placing a crown on Ivan Asen's head. The inscription is in Bulgarian and abbreviated, and says: "Ivan Asen, Tsar" and "Saint Dimitar". On the other side of the coin is depicted Christ Pantocrator. The inscription is "Jesus Christ, Tsar of the Glory". Due to similarities with the coins of Theodore Komnenos Doukas, it is presumed that the coins might have been minted in the Thessalonica mint, which was at the time under Bulgarian rule.

The uniqueness of Ivan Asen's gold perpera and the peculiarity of its iconography have led a minority of researchers to doubt its authenticity. Its peculiarity is the double gesture of Saint Demetrius who simultaneously crowns the Emperor and gives him a sword, an image found in no Byzantine or other Slavonic coins.

- Billon coins - There are around one hundred preserved coins of that type. On one side is the image of the Emperor and Saint Demetrius upright and holding a scepter with a star. On the other side is depicted Christ Pantocrator. These coins were probably minted in the Thessalonica mint. Their weight is between 3.00 and 3.08 grams.

== Mitso Asen ==
- Billon coins - On one side is depicted the Emperor in 3/4 length, holding a cross in his left and a scepter in his right hand. On the other side is Saint Nicholas in half-length. The inscription "Saint Nicholas" is in Greek. The saint is protector of the sailors and was a patron of the Emperor probably because the personal lands of Mitso Asen (1256–1257) included the port of Nesebar and its environs.

== Constantine Tikh Asen ==
The coinage of that ruler is distinguished by its variety, the use of new iconographic types and the precise engraving.

- Billon coins

- First type: Obverse - Christ Emanuil; reverse - the Emperor in 3/4 length.
- Second type: Obverse - large Latin Cross; reverse - the Emperor on a throne without back, inscription in Bulgarian "Konstantin, Tsar Asen".
- Third type: Obverse - Christ Ubrus and ligature inscription "Jesus Christ"; reverse - the Emperor on horseback, inscription in Bulgarian "Konstantin, Tsar Asen". For the first time in Bulgarian coins the ruler is depicted on a horse. The iconographic type "Urbus" (Mandylion) is unique for Byzantine-Slavonic coinage.
- Fourth type: Obverse - Christ Pantocrator; reverse - the Emperor on horseback with inscription in Bulgarian "Constantine, Tsar Asen".
- Fifth type: Obverse - Virgin Mary Hagioritissa; reverse - the Emperor upright holding a scepter in his right hand. Weight - 3,04 g; diameter - 26,25 mm. There are few preserved coins of that type.
- Sixth type: Obverse - Christ Pantocrator; reverse - the Emperor upright.
- Seventh type: Obverse - Seraph with six wings; reverse - half-length portrait of the Emperor holding a labrium in his right hand and a sphere with a cross in his left hand. The depiction of a six-winged seraph is unique for the Medieval Bulgarian coinage. It is still not proved that this type of coin belongs to Constantine Tikh Asen (1257-1277) because the inscription of the preserved item is damaged and only the word "Tsar" can be read.

Billon coin depicting a Latin cross

Billon coin depicting Constantine Tikh Asen on a throne

Billon coin depicting Constantine Tikh Asen on horseback

== George I Terter ==
- Billon coins: Obverse - Christ on a throne; reverse - George I Terter (1280–1292) and his son Theodore Svetoslav as co-emperors. They are upright in full length holding together a flag or a cross.

== Theodore Svetoslav ==
Theodore Svetoslav (1300–1321) was the first Bulgarian ruler who minted silver coins called aspra (from Greek aspron, meaning "white").

- Silver coins: Frontage - Christ Pantocrator sitting on a throne; reverse - the Emperor upright holding a cross, and inscription in Bulgarian "Svetoslav, Tsar of the Bulgarians". Its weight is 1,53 G. There three emissions of that type which differ in the quality of the engraving.
- Billon coins: Frontage - large Latin Cross; reverse - the Emperor on a horse. The depiction resembles that of Constantine Tikh but is without the waving mantle. There are two emissions made by different engravers. The inscriptions are in Bulgarian and abbreviated and say: "Theodore" and "Svetoslav Theodore".
Billon coin depicting Theodore Svetoslav on horseback

A silver coin of Theodore Svetoslav

== Michael Shishman ==
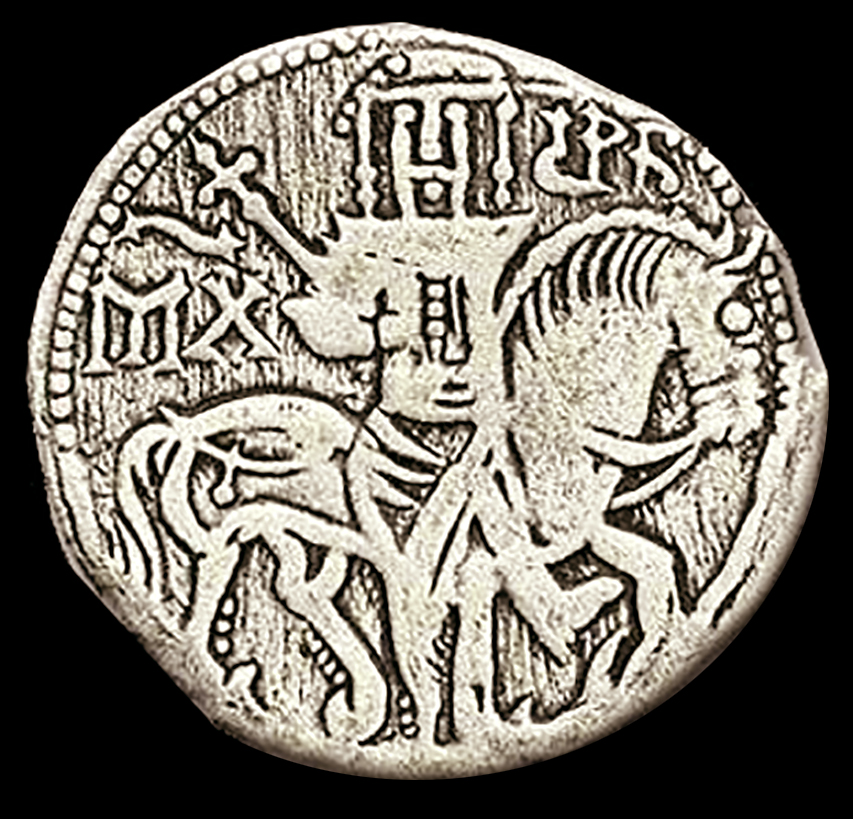
A silver gros 1323-1330 of Tzar Michael III Shishman Asen of Bulgaria

- Silver coins: Obverse - Christ Pantocrator sitting on a throne with high back; reverse - the Emperor on horseback, with inscription "Michael Tsar". A number of the coins of Michael Shishman (1323–1330) were later re-minted as coins of Ivan Alexander (1331–1371).

== Ivan Alexander ==
- Silver coins:

- First type: Obverse - Christ Pantocrator sitting on a throne; on the reverse, the Emperor upright holding a scepter and a sphere with a cross. There is an inscription in Bulgarian "Alexander, Tsar of the Bulgarians". There are several varieties depending on their weight and the engraving.

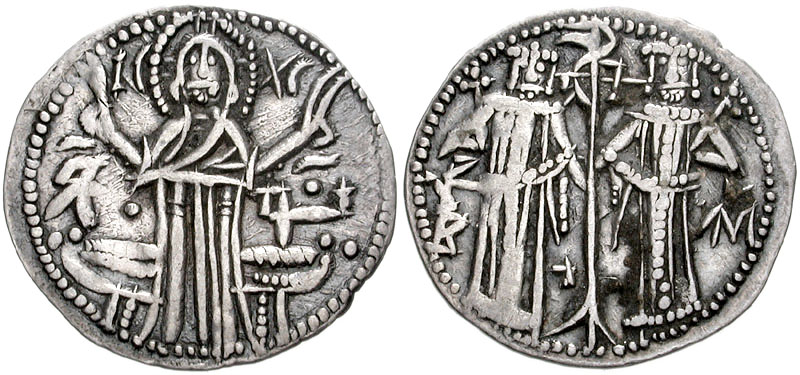
A silver coin of Ivan Alexander and his son Michael Asen.

- Second type: Obverse - Christ upright in full-length, blessing with two hands; reverse - Ivan Alexander and his son Michael Asen together holding a flag. That is the most common Medieval Bulgarian coin which is often discovered during archaeological excavations. The names of the two co-Emperors are written in monograms. On some of the coins there are marks of the Wallachian Prince Vladislav I. That ruler did not mint his own coins and used the coinage of his suzerain Ivan Alexander, adding his signs.

- Copper coins:

Some of the copper coins of Ivan Alexander are hollow (stamini) and others are flat (asarioni).

First type: Obverse - a monogram of Ivan Alexander; reverse - the Emperor on a horse.
Second type: Obverse - a monogram of Ivan Alexander; reverse - the Emperor upright in full length holding a scepter and a sphere with cross.
Third type: Obverse - monograms of the name and the title of Ivan Alexander; on the reverse, the Emperor upright in 3/4 length.
Forth type: Obverse - a depiction of a castle with three towers and inscription in Bulgarian "Tarnovo"; on the reverse - Ivan Alexander and his son Michael Asen holding a flag. These are the most common Bulgarian copper coins from the Middle Ages. The stylized image of the capital can be seen only there and is used in the contemporary coat-of-arms of Veliko Tarnovo.
Fifth type: Obverse - a trident-shaped monogram resembling the monograms of Michael Shishman; on the reverse, Ivan Alexander and Michael Asen holding together a cross.
Sixth type: Obverse - monograms the name and the title of the monarch; on the reverse - Ivan Alexander and Empress Theodora together holding a cross. There are three varieties of that common coin.
Seventh type: Obverse - Christ Pantocrator on a throne; on the reverse, Archangel Michael. Due to the lack of the ruler's name it is not proved whether it belongs to Ivan Alexander's coinage. There are theories that it was minted by Michael II Asen.
Eight type: Obverse - a cross with acanthine leaves; on the reverse - Ivan Alexander upright in full length. There are several varieties which differ in the weights and the quality of engraving.
Ninth type: Obverse - a cross with acanthine leaves; on the reverse - a double-headed eagle. It is not proven whether these coins belong to Ivan Alexander. The engraving is of high quality.
Tenth type: Obverse - an Orthodox cross; on the reverse, a monogram-trident identical to that in the copper coin of the Emperor and his son Michael Asen.

== Michael Asen ==
A silver coin of Michael Asen and his wife Irina.

- Silver coins:

- First type: Obverse - Christ on a throne; on the reverse - Michael Asen and Saint Stephen upright holding a flag. The coin somewhat resembles the Venetian ducats. The names of the Prince and the Saint are written in different ways in the different varieties of the coin. The weight is from 1.40 g to 1.90 g.
- Second type: Obverse - Christ on a throne; on the reverse - Michael Asen and his wife Irina holding a flag. According to some researchers, the coins are from Michael II Asen and his mother Irina Komnina. There are two varieties of that coin. In the second variety Michael Asen and his wife hold a cross instead of a flag. The inscription is in Bulgarian and says "Irina Tsaritsa, Mihail Tsar". The weight varies from 1,50 G to 1,80 G.

- Copper coins:

- First type: Obverse - Bust of Christ Pantocrator; on the reverse - Michael Asen upright in full length with inscription in Bulgarian "Mihail Tsar". That coin in considered as part of Michael Asen's coinage due to the similarities of the engraving technique with the coins of Ivan Alexander.
- Second type: Obverse - monogram-trident; on the reverse, Michael Asen on a horse. According to some research, the coin is of Michael Shishman.

== See also ==
- Bulgarian lev

== Sources ==
- "Българските средновековни монети" - Стоян Авдев, издателство "БЕСИКЕ", София 2007 г.
- "Българските монети" - Христо Божков, Венцислав Пейков, издателство "Борина", София 1993 г.
