= Solidus =

Late Roman Empire gold coin

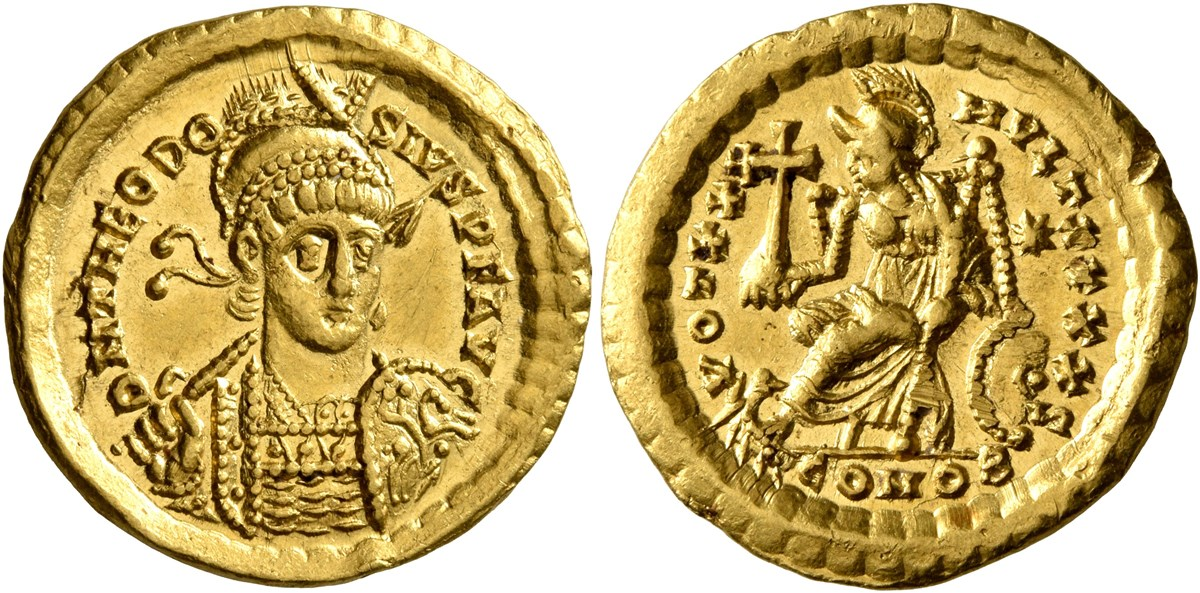
Solidus of Theodosius II, minted in Constantinople c. 435. This design of the emperor with the spear over his shoulder was the conventional portrait for over a century in the Eastern Roman Empire, from AD 395 to 537

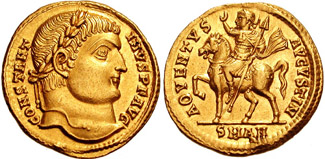
Solidus of Constantine the Great, minted in AD 324 or 325

The solidus (Latin 'solid'; pl.: solidi) or nomisma (Greek: νόμισμα, romanized: nómisma, lit. 'coin') was a highly pure gold coin issued in the Later Roman Empire and Byzantine Empire. It was introduced in the early 4th century, replacing the aureus, and its weight of about 4.45 grams remained relatively constant for seven centuries.

In the Byzantine Empire, the solidus or nomisma remained a highly pure gold coin until the 11th century, when several Byzantine emperors began to strike the coin with less and less gold. The nomisma was finally abolished by Alexios I Komnenos in 1092, who replaced it with the hyperpyron, which also came to be known as a "bezant". The Byzantine solidus also inspired the zolotnik in the Kievan Rus' and the originally slightly less pure gold dinar first issued by the Umayyad Caliphate beginning in 697.

In Western Europe, the solidus was the main gold coin of commerce from late Roman times to the Early Middle Ages.

In Late Antiquity and the Middle Ages, the solidus also functioned as a unit of weight equal to 1/72 Roman pound (approximately 4.45 grams).

== Solidus as a Roman coin ==
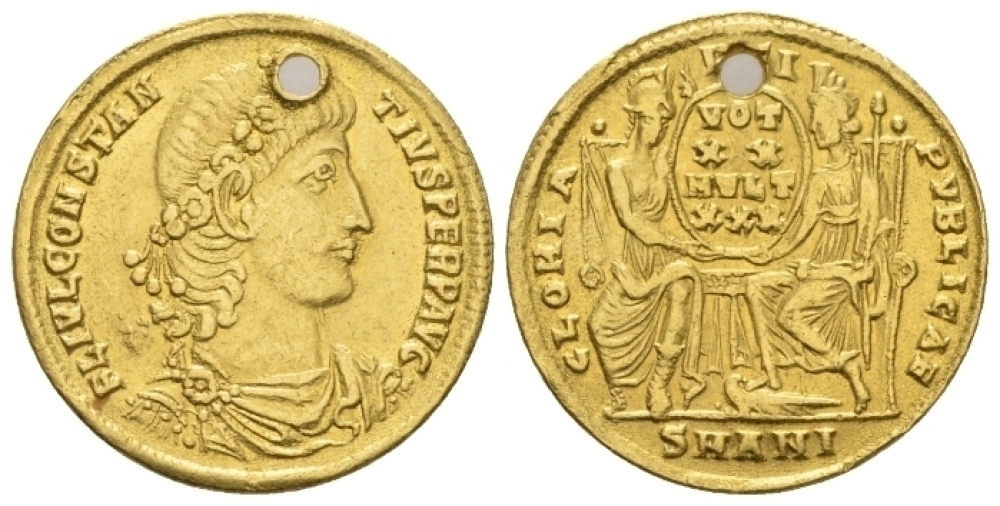
Solidus of Constantius II from Antioch, 347–355. A holed coin such as this was likely worn as a jewelry piece by a prominent or wealthy Roman

The solidus was initially introduced by Diocletian in small issues and later reintroduced for mass circulation by Constantine the Great in c. AD 312 and was composed of relatively solid gold. Constantine's solidus was struck at a rate of 72 to a Roman pound (of about 326.6 g) of gold; each coin weighed 24 Greco-Roman carats (189 mg each), or about 4.5 grams of gold per coin. By this time, the solidus was worth 275,000 increasingly debased denarii, each denarius containing just 5% (or one twentieth) of the amount of silver it had three and a half centuries beforehand. With the exception of the early issues of Constantine the Great and the odd usurpers, the solidus today is a much more affordable gold Roman coin to collect, compared to the older aureus, as well as those of Heraclius, Honorius and later Byzantine issues.

== In the Byzantine period ==
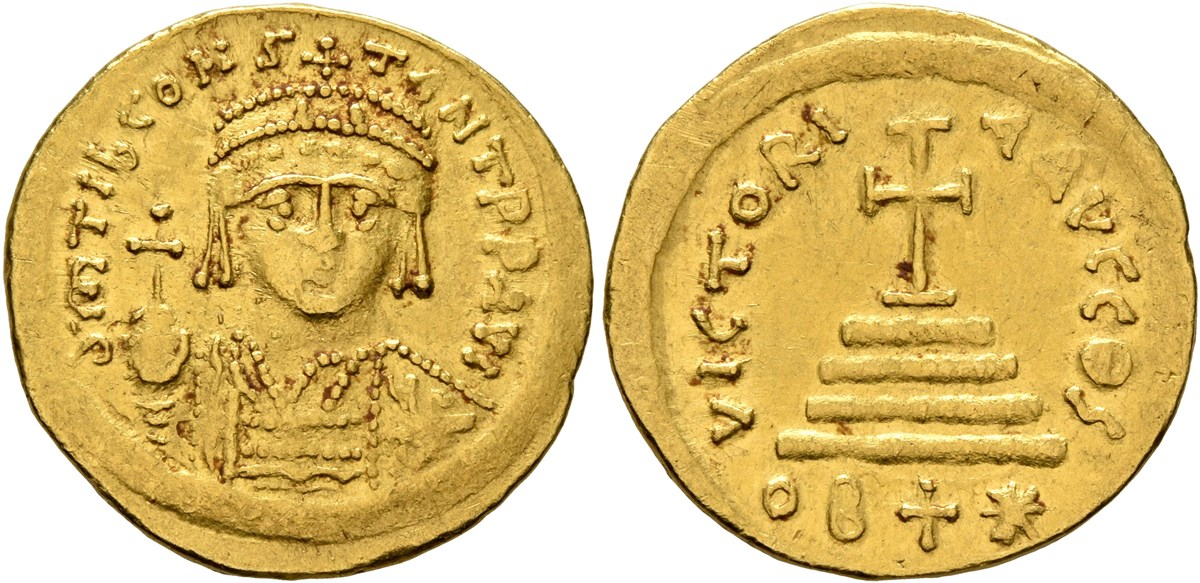
Light-weight solidus of 22 siliquae minted by emperor Tiberius Constantine at Antioch in Syria, c. 580. The light-weight solidi were minted from c. 550–650 and were primarily used for foreign trade with Europe.

The solidus was maintained essentially unaltered in weight, dimensions and purity, until the 10th century. During the 6th and 7th centuries "lightweight" solidi of 20, 22 or 23 siliquae (one siliqua was 1/24 of a solidus) were struck along with the standard weight issues, presumably for trade purposes or to pay tribute. The lightweight solidi were especially popular in the West, and many of these lightweight coins have been found in Europe, Russia and Georgia. The lightweight solidi were distinguished by different markings on the coin, usually in the exergue for the 20 and 22 siliquae coins, and by stars in the field for the 23 siliquae coins.

Despite the Eastern half of the Roman Empire being predominantly Greek speaking, its coins were still inscribed in Latin well into the eighth century. The letters in the inscriptions began to lose their Classical Latin look under the emperor Heraclius, and the Latin text was replaced with Greek script in the early years of the ninth century, during the reign of Constantine VI.

In theory the solidus was struck from pure gold, but the limits of refining techniques meant that, in practice, the coins were often about 23k fine (95.8% gold). In the Greek-speaking world during the Roman period, and then in the Byzantine economy, the solidus was known as the νόμισμα (nomisma, plural nomismata). In the 10th century Emperor Nicephorus II Phocas (963–969) introduced a new lightweight gold coin called the tetarteron nomisma that circulated alongside the solidus, and from that time the solidus (nomisma) became known as the ἱστάμενον νόμισμα (histamenon nomisma), in the Greek speaking world. Initially it was difficult to distinguish the two coins, as they had the same design, dimensions and purity, and there were no marks of value to distinguish the denominations. The only difference was the weight. The tetarteron nomisma was a lighter coin, about 4.05 grams, reminiscent of the lightweight solidi of the 6th and 7th centuries, but the histamenon nomisma maintained the traditional weight of 4.5 grams. To eliminate confusion between the two, from the reign of Basil II (975–1025) the solidus (histamenon nomisma) was struck as a thinner coin with a larger diameter but with the same weight and purity as before. From the middle of the 11th century, the larger diameter histamenon nomisma was struck on a concave (cup-shaped) flan, while the smaller tetarteron nomisma continued to be struck on a smaller flat flan.

== Debasement, decline, and elimination of the solidus ==
When the former money changer Michael IV the Paphlagonian (1034–41) assumed the imperial throne in 1034, he began the slow process of debasing both the tetarteron nomisma and the histamenon nomisma. The debasement was gradual at first, but then accelerated rapidly: about 21 carats (87.5% pure) during the reign of Constantine IX Monomachos (1042–1055), 18 carats (75%) under Constantine X Doukas (1059–1067), and 16 carats (66.7%) under Romanos IV Diogenes (1068–1071). After Romanos lost the disastrous Battle of Manzikert to the Turks, the empire's ability to generate revenue deteriorated further and the solidus continued to be debased. The coin's purity reached 14 carats (58%) under Michael VII Doukas (1071–1078), 8 carats (33%) under Nikephoros III Botaneiates (1078–1081) and 0 to 8 carats during the first eleven years of the reign of Alexios I Komnenos (1081–1118). Alexios reformed the coinage in 1092 and eliminated the solidus (histamenon nomisma) altogether. In its place he introduced a new gold coin called the hyperpyron nomisma at about 20.5k fine (85%). The weight, dimensions and purity of the hyperpyron nomisma remained stable until the Sack of Constantinople by the Crusaders in 1204. After that time the exiled Empire of Nicea continued to strike a debased hyperpyron nomisma. Michael VIII Palaiologos recaptured Constantinople in 1261, and under him the restored Byzantine Empire continued to strike the debased hyperpyron nomisma until the joint reign of John V Palaiologos and John VI (1347–1354), who struck the final Byzantine gold coins. After that time the hyperpyron nomisma continued as a unit of account, but it was no longer struck in gold.

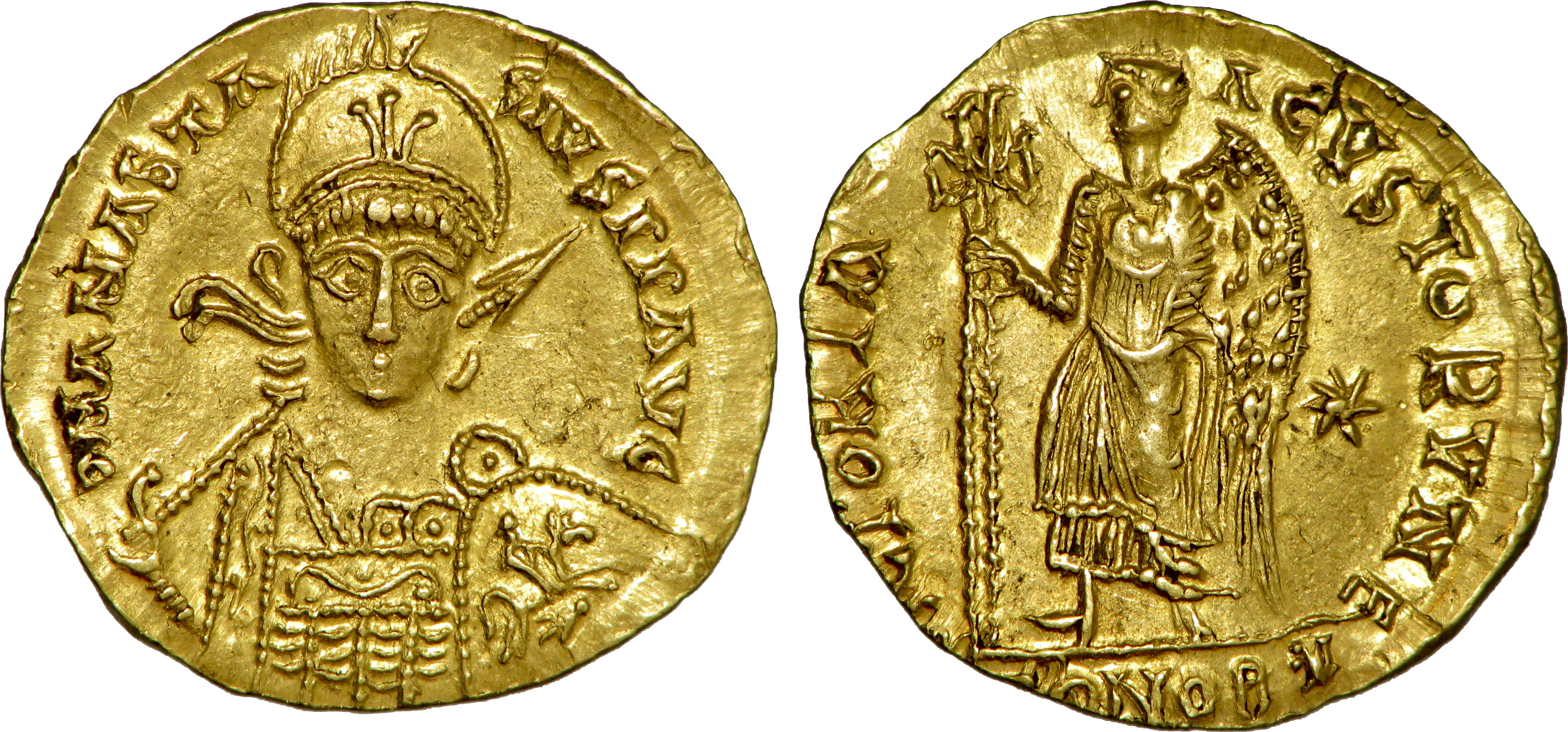
Solidus to victory issued under Clovis I (between 491 and 507 CE). The coin bears the legend of the Eastern emperor Anastasius and is an example of the Germanic "imitative" solidi

== Mints across the empire ==
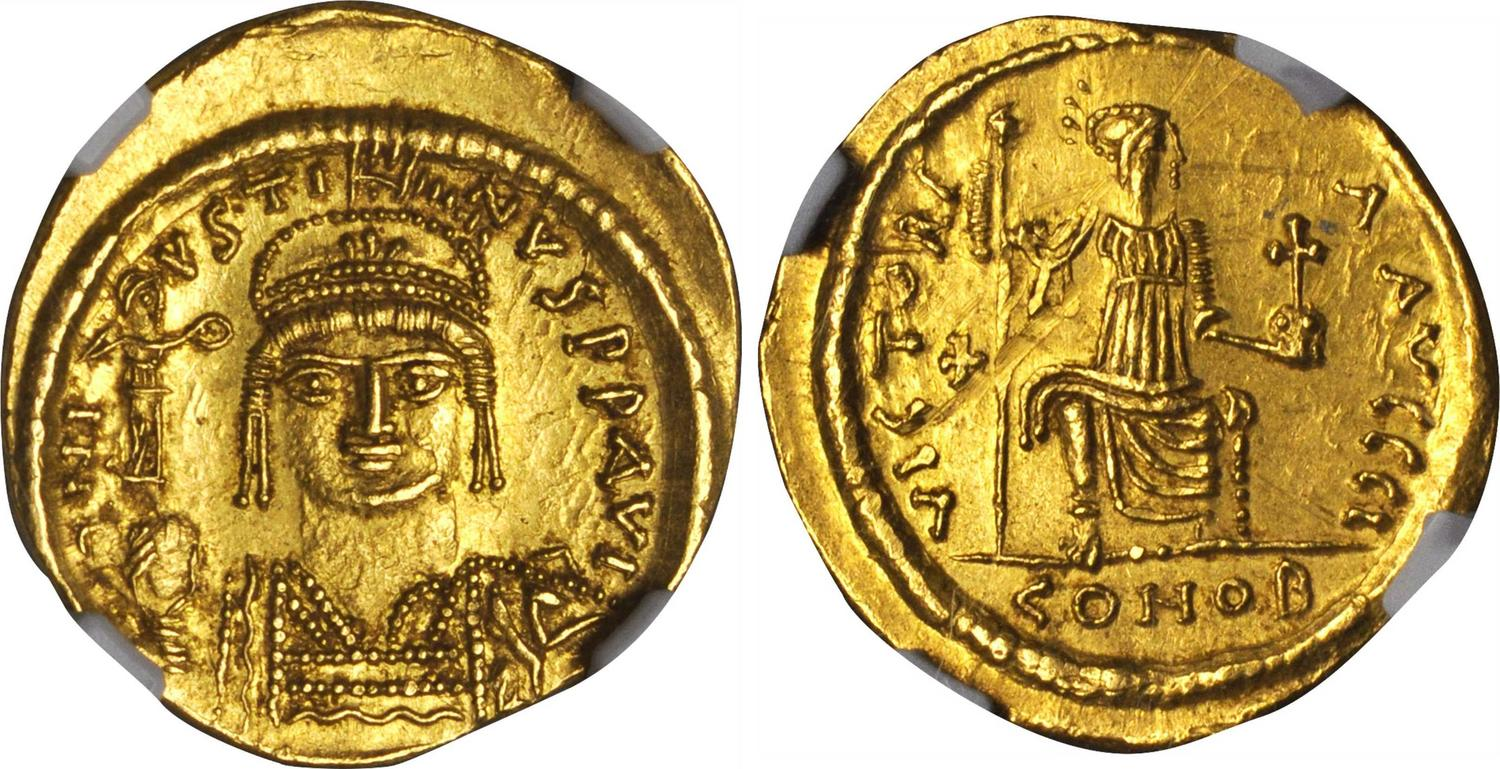
A provincial solidus of Justin II from Alexandria, Egypt minted in c. 570. Provincial solidi from Alexandria are rare today

From the 4th to the 11th centuries, solidi were minted mostly at the Constantinople mint. However, certain branch mints were active producers of solidi. In the Roman Empire during the 4th century, Trier, Rome, Milan, and Ravenna were the main producers of gold coins in the West, while Constantinople, Antioch, Thessalonica, and Nicomedia struck gold coins in the East. The Germanic invasions of the early fifth century led to the closure of many provincial mints, and by 410 the only mints that struck gold solidi were Rome, Ravenna, Constantinople, and Thessalonica. The Fall of the Western Roman Empire in 476 saw the end of official Roman coinage in the West, though Germanic successor kingdoms such as the Ostrogothic Kingdom and the Franks continued to strike imitative solidi, with the portrait and title of the emperor in Constantinople.

Justinian I's reconquests in the Western Empire reopened several mints, which began to strike gold solidi. His reconquest of the Vandal Kingdom reopened the mint at Carthage, where a great number of solidi were struck. In the early seventh century, the mint at Carthage began to strike small "globular" solidi, about half the size of a normal solidus but much thicker. These "globular" solidi were only struck in Carthage, and the mint continued to produce great quantities of solidi until its conquest by the Arabs in 698. Justinian's conquests also allowed for imperial mints to begin coining solidi in Italy, with the mints at Ravenna and Rome once again striking official Roman coins. Under Justinian, Antioch in Syria started to mint solidi again after a 150-year hiatus, and a few solidi were struck at Alexandria in Egypt, though these are very rare today.

The mint at Syracuse grew beginning in the mid-seventh century during the reign of Constans II, who briefly moved the empire's capital to the city. During the 8th and 9th centuries, the Syracuse mint produced a large number of solidi that failed to meet the specifications of the coins produced by the imperial mint in Constantinople. The Syracuse solidi were generally lighter (about 3.8g) and only 19k fine (79% pure).

Although imperial law forbade merchants from exporting solidi outside imperial territory, this was very loosely enforced, and many solidi have been found in Russia, Central Europe, Georgia, and Syria. In particular, it seems as if the light-weight solidi were meant for foreign trade. In the 7th century they became a desirable circulating currency in Arabian countries. Since the solidi circulating outside the empire were not used to pay taxes to the emperor, they did not get reminted, and the soft pure-gold coins quickly became worn.

Through the end of the 7th century, Arabian copies of solidi – dinars minted by the caliph Abd al-Malik ibn Marwan, who had access to supplies of gold from the upper Nile – began to circulate in areas outside the Byzantine Empire. These corresponded in weight to only 20 carats (4.0 g), but matched the weight of the lightweight (20 siliquae) solidi that were circulating in those areas. The two coins circulated together in these areas for a time.

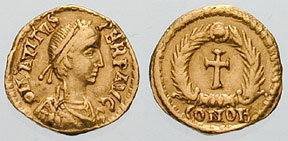
Avitus tremissis, one-third of a solidus, c. AD 456

The solidus was not marked with any face value throughout its seven-century manufacture and circulation. Fractions of the solidus known as semissis (half-solidi) and tremissis (one-third solidi) were also produced. The fractional gold coins were especially popular in the West where the economy had been significantly simplified and few purchases required a denomination so large as the solidus.

The word soldier is ultimately derived from solidus, referring to the solidi with which soldiers were paid.

== Impact on world currencies ==
In medieval Europe, where the only coin in circulation was the silver penny (denier), the solidus was used as a unit of account equal to 12 deniers. Variations on the word solidus in the local language gave rise to a number of currency units:

=== France ===
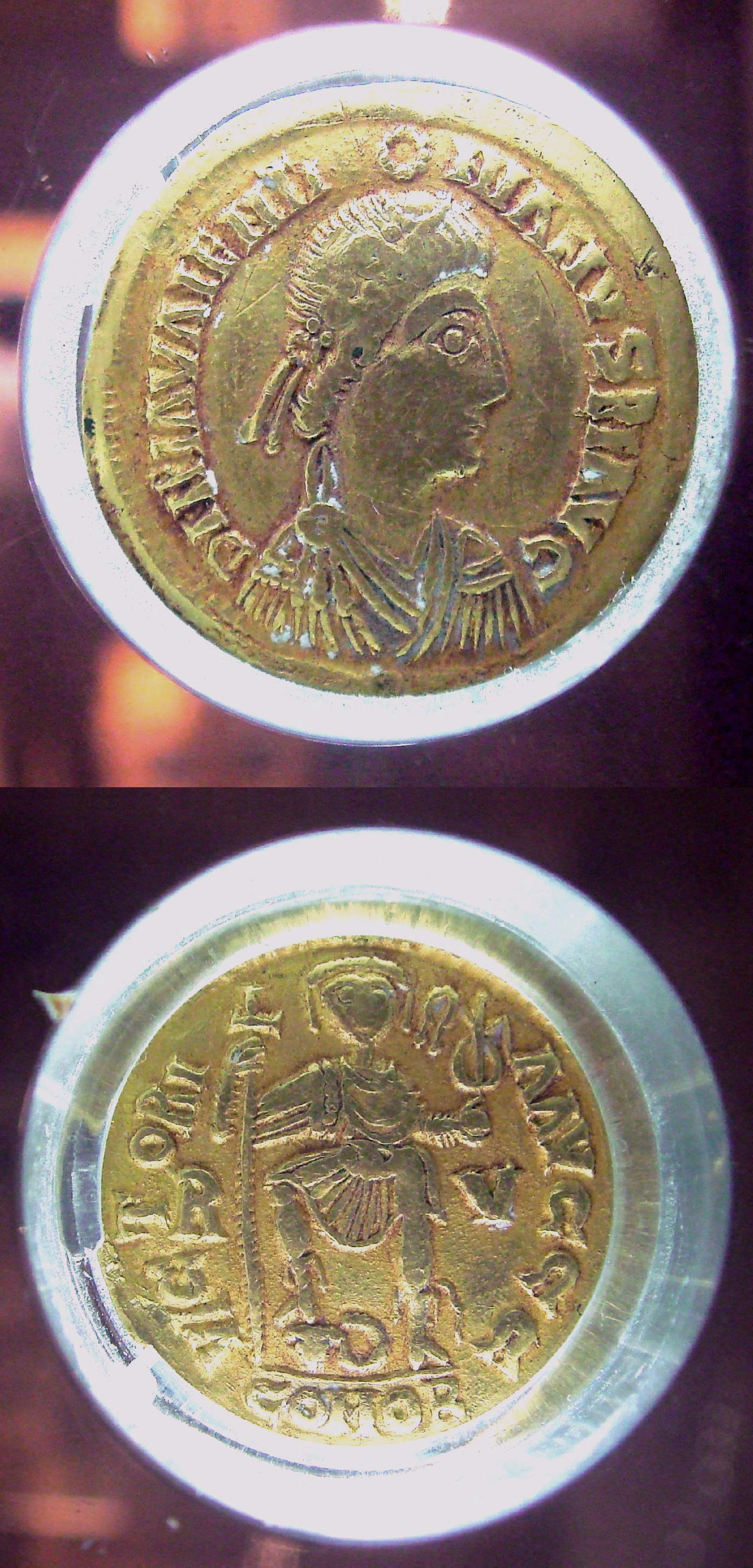
Northern Gaul "sou", probably struck by the Visigoths c. 440–450, 4.24 grams

In the French language, which evolved directly from common or vulgar Latin over the centuries, solidus changed to soldus, then solt, then sol and finally sou. No gold solidi were minted after the Carolingians adopted the silver standard. Thenceforward, the solidus or sol was a paper accounting unit equivalent to one-twentieth of a pound (librum or livre) of silver and divided into 12 denarii or deniers. The monetary unit disappeared with decimalisation and introduction of the franc by the French First Republic during the French Revolution in 1795, but the coin of 5 centimes, a twentieth part of the franc, inherited the name "sou" as a nickname: in the first half of the 20th century, a coin or an amount of 5 francs was still often referred to as cent sous.

To this day, in French around the world, solde means the balance of an account or invoice, or sales (seasonal rebate), and is the specific name of a soldier's salary. Although the sou as a coin disappeared more than two centuries ago, the word is still used as a synonym of money in many French phrases: avoir des sous is being rich, être sans un sou is being poor (same construction as "penniless").

=== French Canada ===
In Canadian French, sou and sou noir are commonly employed terms for the Canadian cent. Cenne and cenne noire are also regularly used. The European French centime is not used in Quebec. In Canada one hundredth of a dollar is officially known as a cent (pronounced /sɛnt/) in both English and French. However, in practice, a feminine form of cent, cenne (pronounced /sɛn/) has mostly replaced the official "cent" outside bilingual areas. Spoken use of the official masculine form of cent is uncommon in francophone-only areas of Canada. Quarter dollar coins in colloquial Quebec French are sometimes called trente-sous (thirty cents), because of a series of changes in terminology, currencies, and exchange rates. After the British conquest of Canada in 1759, French coins gradually fell out of use, and sou became a nickname for the halfpenny, which was similar in value to the French sou. Spanish pesos and U.S. dollars were also in use, and from 1841 to 1858 the exchange rate was fixed at $4 = £1 (or 400¢ = 240d). This made 25¢ equal to 15d, or 30 halfpence i.e. trente sous. In 1858, pounds, shillings, and pence were abolished in favour of dollars and cents, and the nickname sou began to be used for the 1¢ coin, but the term un trente-sous for a 25¢ coin has endured. In the vernacular Quebec French sous and cennes are also frequently used to refer to money in general, especially small amounts.

=== Italy ===
The name of the medieval Italian silver soldo (plural soldi), coined since the 11th century, was derived from solidus.

This word is still in common use today in Italy in its plural soldi with the same meaning as the English equivalent "money". The word saldo, like the French solde mentioned above, means the balance of an account or invoice; the German Saldo is a loan word with the same meaning. It also means "seasonal rebate".

=== Switzerland ===
In the Italian-speaking regions, the word soldo, on top of its modern uses in Italian, is still used in its archaic meaning: the pay soldiers receive. This is also true in French-speaking Switzerland, where Swiss soldiers will receive il soldo – la solde; and German-speaking Switzerland, where it is der Sold.

In Italian the verb soldare (assoldare) means hiring, more often soldiers (soldati) or mercenaries, deriving exactly from the use of the word as described above.

=== Spain and Peru, Portugal and Brazil ===
As with soldier in English, the Spanish and Portuguese equivalent is soldado (almost the same pronunciation). The name of the medieval Spanish sueldo and Portuguese soldo (which also means salary) were derived from solidus; the term sweldo in most Philippine languages (Tagalog, Cebuano, etc.) is derived from the Spanish. The form used in Catalan is sou, earlier sol, spelled like the French term but pronounced differently.

The Spanish and Portuguese word saldo, like the French solde, means the balance of an account or invoice. It is also used in some other languages, such as German and Afrikaans.

Some have suggested that the Peruvian unit of currency, the sol, is derived from solidus, but the standard unit of Peruvian currency was the real until 1863. Throughout the Spanish world the dollar equivalent was 8 reales ("pieces of eight"), which circulated legally in the United States until 1857. In the US, the colloquial expression "two bits" for a quarter dollar, and the stock market currency real last used for accounting, traded in 1/8 of a U.S. dollar until 2001, still echoes the legal usage in the US in the 19th century.

The Peruvian sol was introduced at a rate of 5.25 per British Pound, or just under four shillings (the legacy soldus). The term soles de oro was introduced in 1933, three years after Peru had actually abandoned the gold standard. In 1985 the Peruvian sol was replaced at one thousand to one by the inti, representing the sun god of the Incas. By 1991 it had to be replaced with a new sol at a million to one, after which it remained reasonably stable.

=== United Kingdom ===
King Offa of Mercia began minting silver pennies on the Carolingian system c. 785. As on the continent, English coinage was restricted for centuries to the penny, while the scilling, understood to be the value of a cow in Kent or a sheep elsewhere, was merely a unit of account equivalent to 12 pence. The Tudors minted the first shilling coins. Prior to decimalisation in the United Kingdom in 1971, the abbreviation s. (from solidus) was used to represent shillings, just as d. (denarius) and £ (libra) were used to represent pence and pounds respectively.

=== Vietnam ===
The French term sou was borrowed into Vietnamese as the word xu (Chinese: 樞). The term is usually used to simply mean the word "coin" often in compound in the forms of đồng xu (銅樞) or tiền xu (錢樞). The modern Vietnamese đồng is nominally divided into 100 xu.

== See also ==
- Bezant – Generic medieval Western European name for eastern gold coins
- Hoxne Hoard – Roman hoard found in England
- Roman and Byzantine coinage
- Solidus or slash as a punctuation mark
