= Scyphate =

Type of Byzantine coin

Scyphate is a term frequently used in numismatics to refer to the concave or "cup-shaped" Byzantine coins of the 11th–14th centuries.

This usage emerged in the premodern era and was solidified by scholars of the 19th century, when the term scyphatus, attested in south Italian documents of the 11th and 12th centuries, was erroneously interpreted as deriving from the Greek word skyphos (σκύφος, 'cup'). In reality, the term probably derives from the Arabic word shafah, 'edge, rim', and refers to the distinctive and conspicuous border of the early histamena gold coins. Due to this misunderstanding, the term "scyphate" has been widely applied to the concave gold, silver, and copper coins of the late Byzantine Empire and the foreign issues imitating it. These coins are more properly designated as trachea (singular: trachy, from Greek τραχύ, 'rough, uneven').

== Gallery ==
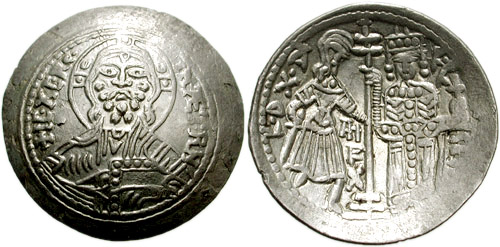
"Scyphate" silver ducat of Roger II of Sicily.

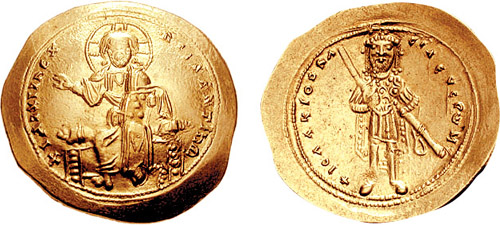
"Scyphate" histamenon of Emperor Isaac I Komnenos (r. 1057–1059).

== Sources ==
- Grierson, Philip (1999). Byzantine Coinage (PDF). Washington, DC: Dumbarton Oaks. ISBN 978-0-88402-274-9. Archived from the original (PDF) on 2016-03-03.
- Kazhdan, Alexander, ed. (1991). The Oxford Dictionary of Byzantium. Oxford and New York: Oxford University Press. ISBN 0-19-504652-8.
