= Nomisma =

Ancient Greek word for money

Nomisma (Ancient Greek: νόμισμα) was the ancient Greek word for "money" and is derived from nomos (νόμος) meaning "'anything assigned,' 'a usage,' 'custom,' 'law,' 'ordinance,' or 'that which is a habitual practice.'"

...but money has become by convention a sort of representative of demand; and this is why it has the name 'money' (nomisma) – because it exists not by nature but by law (nomos) and it is in our power to change it and make it useless.

— Aristotle, Nicomachean Ethics [1133b 1].

The term nomos may also refer to an approximately 8 gram Achaean coin denomination.

== Other uses ==
In Modern Greek, the word nomisma means "currency". It is also a term used by numismatists when referring to the pieces of money or coin in the plural nomismata an example of which is the Aes rude of Numa Pompilius (the 2nd King of Rome).

== See also ==
- Aristotle
- Numismatics
- Roman Republican coinage
