= Coinage of the Republic of Venice =

Coins produced by the Republic of Venice

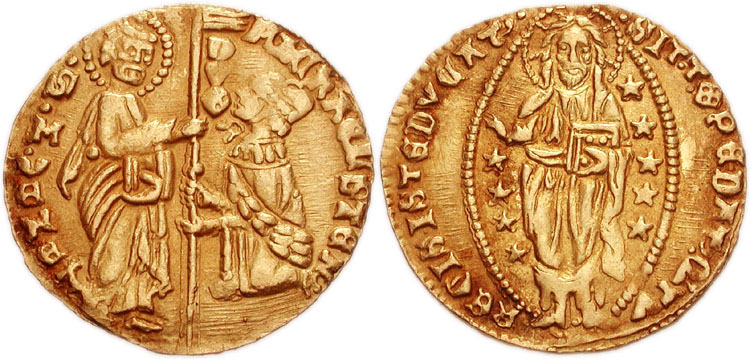
Ducat of Michele Steno (1400–1413)

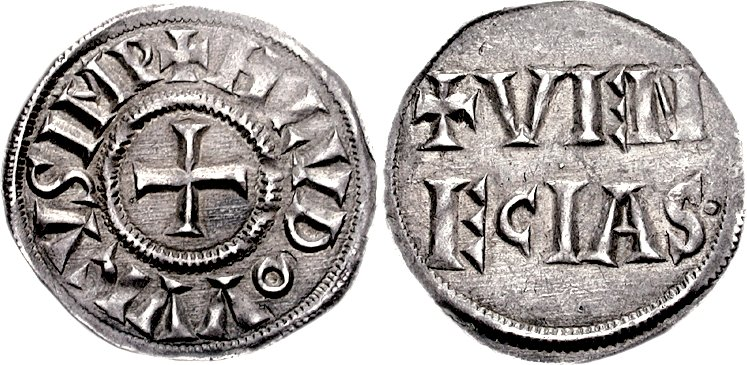
Denarius of Louis the Pious (minted 819–822)

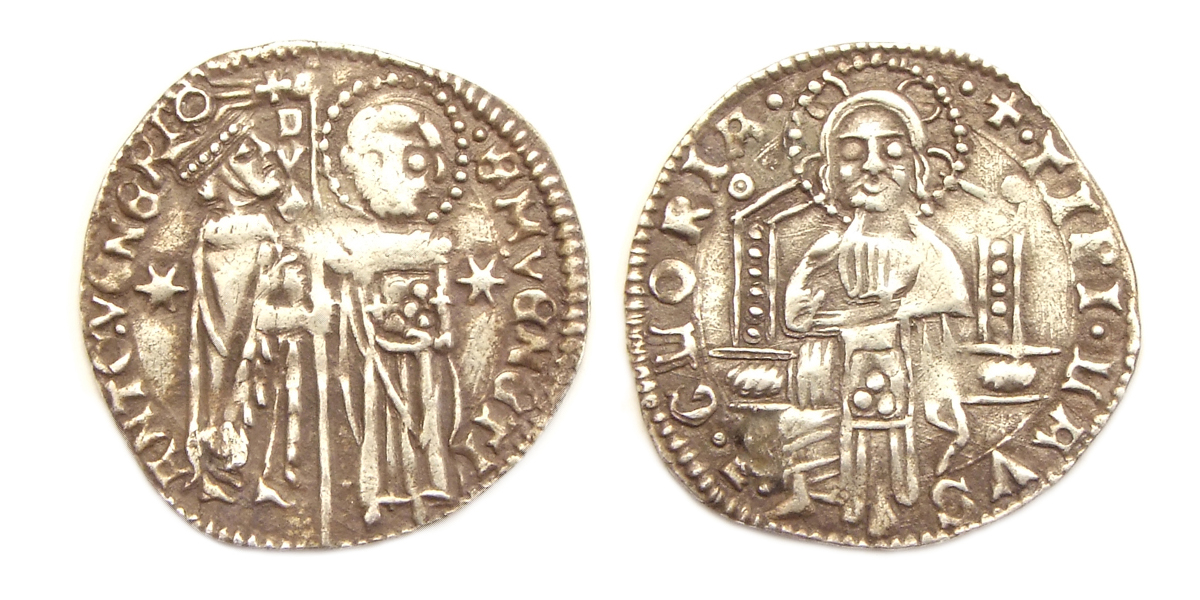
Republic of Venice, Grosso or 'Matapan' of Antonio Venier, Doge of Venice (1382–1400)

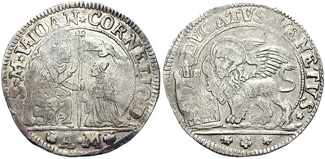
Silver ducato of Giovanni II Cornaro

The Coinage of the Republic of Venice include the coins produced by the Republic of Venice from the late 12th century to 1866. After this date, coins were still produced in Venice.

From the 16th century, the coinage was made in the very prominently-located Zecca of Venice, close to the Doge's Palace.

== History ==
Although there is no information about coinage in what was the Duchy of Venice (a semi-independent entity within the Byzantine Empire from which the Republic of Venice originated), ancient historians such as Andrea Dandolo and Marin Sanudo mention that the privilege of coinage was given to Venice by the kings of Italy Rudolph II (in 921) and Berengar II (in 950); however, it is more likely that this privilege had been granted by Byzantine emperors, as coins with the names of Venice and the name of German emperors Louis I (814–840) and Lothair I (840–855) had been already in circulation before the aforementioned dates. From around 1031, there are records of coins minted under doge Ottone Orseolo, while in 1193–1202 Enrico Dandolo issued in Venice the silver coin called Matapan, named after the Greek promontory.

The most common type of Venetian coin is the ducati issued in silver and gold. The gold ducato was later known as zecchino; this had the doge's image receiving the standard from St. Mark on the obverse. The zecchino had on the reverse Christ within an oval (mandorla), which also contained nine stars. The zecchini remained unchanged from the first issue, in 1284, to the last one, during the reign of the last doge of Venice in 1796, Ludovico Manin.

See Zecca of Venice for the organization and operations of the mint in the Renaissance and the remaining centuries of the Venetian Republic.

== Coins ==
The main coins minted during the Republic of Venice include:

- silver ducato (or Matapan), minted for the first time between 1193 and 1202; it was one of the first grossi.
- soldo, in silver, minted during the reign of doge Francesco Dandolo (1328–1339) and doge Giovanni Gradenigo (1355–1356).
- lira (including lira Tron), minted from 1472.
- ducato, minted from 1284, with the same weight and title of Florence's florin. From the 16th century onwards it was called zecchino.
- giustina, name of different types of silver coins minted under doge Alvise II Mocenigo in 1572. A giustina minore ("lesser giustina") was minted under Pasquale Cicogna).
- scudo, both in silver and gold. It showed the city's symbol. The golden scudo was minted for the first time in the 16th century and weighed some 3.40 g
- gazzetta, of the value of 2 soldi.
- quartarolo, a small coin with the value of one quarter denaro, minted for the first time under Enrico Dandolo (1192), and discontinued in 1328.
- tallero, used for overseas trades.

Other types included the osella, a medal-coin awarded by the doge to the Republic's main personalities.

The mint of the Republic's coins was located in Venice, in the Palazzo della Zecca. The coinage was rigidly controlled by the Council of Forty, an assembly with financial-economical tasks, also acting as Supreme Court.

== See also ==
- History of coins in Italy
