= Saxon thaler =

Type of currency

Unit
- Symbol: Pfennig

Denominations
- Subunit
- 1 1/30: Neugroschen
- 1/300: Pfennig
- Banknotes: 1, 5 thaler
- Coins: 1, 2, 5 or 1/2, 10 pfennig or 1 neugroschen, 1 thaler

Demographics
- User(s): Saxony
- This infobox shows the latest status before this currency was rendered obsolete.

The North German thaler was the currency of the Electorate and Kingdom of Saxony until 1857. Between 1754 and 1841, it was equal to three quarters of a Conventionsthaler and was subdivided into 24 Groschen, each of 12 Pfennig. In 1841, Saxony partially decimalized, dividing the Thaler (now equal to the Prussian Thaler) into 30 Neugroschen, each of 10 Pfennig. The Thaler was replaced by the Vereinsthaler at par.

The duchies of Saxe-Altenburg and Saxe-Coburg-Gotha also issued coinage according to the Saxon system, from 1841 and 1837, respectively.

== See also ==
- Reichsmünzordnung
