= Saxon vereinsthaler =

The Vereinsthaler was the currency of the Kingdom of Saxony between 1857 and 1873. It replaced the Thaler at par and was replaced by the Mark at a rate of 1 Vereinsthaler = 3 Mark. The Vereinsthaler was subdivided into 30 Neugroschen, each of 10 Pfennig.
