= Prague groschen =

Coin

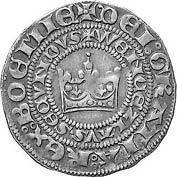
Groschen of Venceslas II., obverse

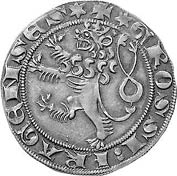
Groschen of Venceslas II., reverse

The Prague groschen (Czech: pražský groš, Latin: grossi pragenses, German: Prager Groschen, Polish: grosz praski) was a groschen-type silver coin that was issued by Wenceslaus II of Bohemia since 1300 in the Kingdom of Bohemia and became very common throughout Medieval Central Europe.

== Etymology ==
The inspiration came from Kingdom of France where groschen (groats) were used since 1266 (under the name gros tournois), and replaced old coins called denar. The name came from the Latin denarius grossus (English: thick denar).

== Coin ==
It is a silver coin with on the obverse the legend DEI GRATIA REX BOEMIE ("By the grace of God the King of Bohemia") and on the reverse GROSSI PRAGENSES ("Prague groschen"). The weight of the coin varies between 3.5 and 3.7 g with a fineness of 933/1000 of silver.

The groschen was subdivided into twelve parvus ("small") coins with a Bohemian heraldic lion sign on the obverse.

== History ==
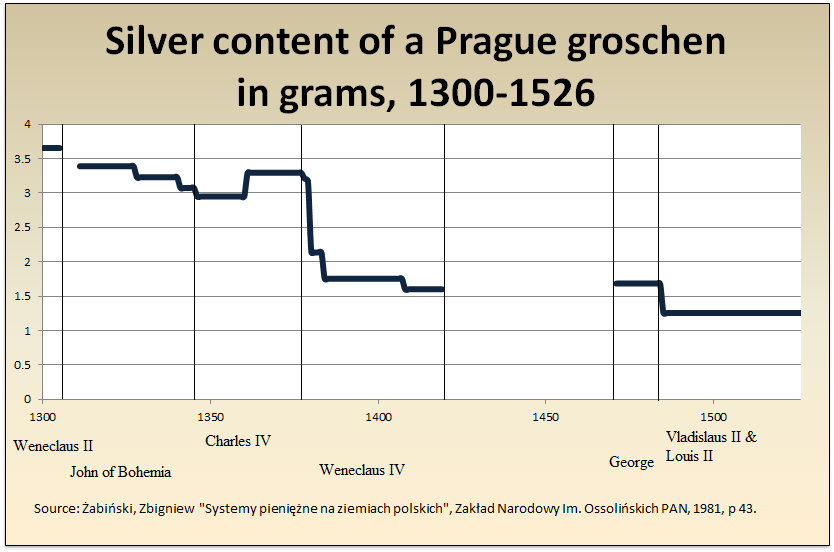
Silver content of the Prague groschen in grams during the period of their mintage (1300–1526)

Minting of this coin started around 1300 after silver mines had been discovered in Kutná Hora (German: Kuttenberg) during the reign of the Bohemian king Wenceslaus II. King Wenceslaus II invited the Italian lawyer Gozzius of Orvieto to create a mining code Ius regale montanorum which was also partly a reform of the coinage. This, and the high amount of silver found in Kutná Hora, resulted in the implementation of the Prague groschen. Because of the high amount of silver used in the coin, it became one of the most popular of the early Groschen-type coins in medieval Europe.

In documents of the era, like e.g. the Peace of Thorn (1411), large amounts of money often were given in more convenient unit, called in Latin sexagena (= threescore) of Prague groschen, which equals to Czech term kopa = 5 dozen = ½ small gross = 60.

After the opening of new silver mines in Jáchymov (German: Joachimsthal) the new currency named Joachimsthaler, in Bohemia known as tolar, gradually came in use. In the years 1547/48, after the defeat of the Bohemian Estates′ Revolt, king Ferdinand I took advantage of the situation and abruptly ended the minting of Prague groschen as part of his centralization (absolutist) efforts in the Bohemian Crown lands. Nevertheless, Prague groschen were still valid and in circulation until 1644 when king Ferdinand III finally prohibited their further use.

== See also ==
- Meissen groschen, modelled on the Prague groschen
- Kraków grosz, an unsuccessful attempt of Polish king Casimir III the Great to imitate the Prague model
- Tolar, another Bohemian coin that replaced the Prague groschen both internally and abroad
