= Venetian grosso =

Medieval silver Venetian coin

The Venetian grosso (plural grossi) is a silver coin first introduced in Venice in 1193 under doge Enrico Dandolo. It originally weighed 2.18 grams, was composed of 98.5% pure silver, and was valued at 26 denarii. Its name is from the same root as groschen and the English groat, all deriving ultimately from the denaro grosso ("large penny").

Its value was allowed to float relative to other Venetian coins until it was pegged to 4 soldini in 1332, incidentally the year the soldino was introduced.

In 1332, 1 grosso was the equivalent of 4 soldini, or 48 denarii.

== Economic background ==
The Renaissance of the 12th century brought wealth and economic sophistication, but Venetians continued to use the badly debased remnants of the coinage system introduced by Charlemagne. Venice struck silver pennies (called denari in Italian) based on the coinage of Verona, which contained less than half a gram of 25% fine silver. Domestic transactions predominantly used these coins or their Veronese counterparts. About 1180, however, Verona modified its coinage, upsetting this practice. For foreign trade, Venetian merchants favored Byzantine coinage or coins of the crusader Kingdom of Jerusalem. Saladin's conquest of Jerusalem in 1187 and the progressing debasement of the Byzantine aspron trachy, however, made this less viable.

Elsewhere in Western Europe the situation was similar. A few efforts were made to reverse the decline of the Carolingian penny which had been their currency for four hundred years. In Lombardy, Frederick Barbarossa struck denari imperiali at double the weight of the pennies of Milan. The consistent fineness of the English sterling, or short cross penny, which Henry II introduced in 1180 made it a popular trading currency in Northern Europe. But it remained for Doge Enrico Dandolo of Venice to make the decisive breakthrough with a higher denomination coin of fine silver called a grosso. These coins had two advantages over the old pennies. First, minting and handling costs were reduced by substituting one large coin for tens of smaller ones. Second, the purity of their silver made them acceptable outside of Venice.

== In Venice ==
The earliest surviving account of Enrico Dandolo's introduction of the Venetian grosso associates it with the outfitting of the Fourth Crusade in 1202 and tradition makes the need to pay for the ships which transported the crusaders the cause of the grosso's introduction. Even though coinage of the grosso might have begun a few years earlier, the influx of silver used to pay for the crusaders' ships led to its first large scale mintage. The coin had 2.18 grams of 98.5% fine silver, the purest medieval metallurgy could make. It was initially called a ducatus argenti since Venice was a duchy, but is more widely known as a grosso or matapano, a Muslim term referring to the seated figure on its reverse.

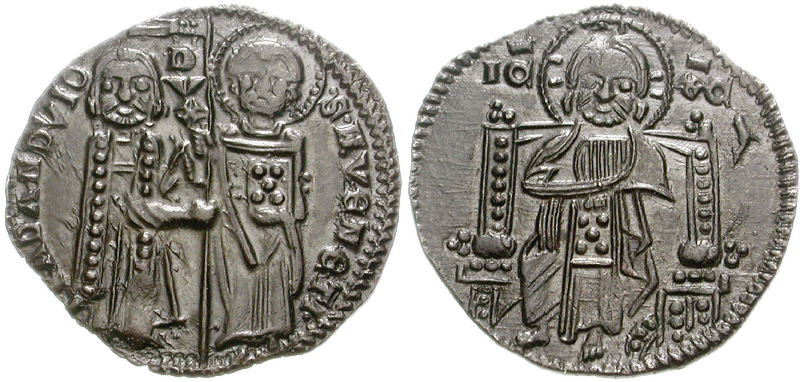
Grosso of Francesco Dandolo, 1328-1339

The designs for the grosso came from the doge's seal and the Byzantine aspron trachy. The obverse shows the standing figures of the doge and Saint Mark the Evangelist, the patron of Venice. On the right, Saint Mark holds the gospel, which is his usual attribute, and presents a Gonfalone to the doge. The doge holds the "ducal promise" Enrico Dandolo was the first doge to swear this coronation oath. The legend names the doge on the left, with his title, DVX in the field. The legend on the right names the saint as S. M. VENETI, i.e. Saint Mark of Venice. The reverse shows Christ facing, sitting on a throne. The legend abbreviates his Greek name as IC XC.

A beaded bordure on both sides of the coin prevented silver from being shaved from the edge of the coin, a practice called clipping. As an additional security measure, Doge Jacopo Tiepolo added distinctive marks, initially variations in the punctuation in the obverse legend and later small marks near Christ's feet on the reverse, which identified the mint master responsible for the issues. But, except for updating the name of the doge and the addition of the reverse legend, TIBI LAVS 3 GLORIA, by Doge Michele Steno, there were no significant changes in the grosso for one hundred and fifty years. Indeed, around 1237 the doge's coronation oath included a promise that he would not change the coinage without authorization from the council.

Change did come, however. Between 1340 and 1370, increases in the price of silver forced most of the doges to stop issuing grossi, and the others to issue only a few. When Doge Andrea Contarini resumed production of grossi their weight began to fall and continued falling until Cristoforo Moro struck the last Venetian grossi with a weight of 0.45 grams.

== Influence of the Venetian grosso ==
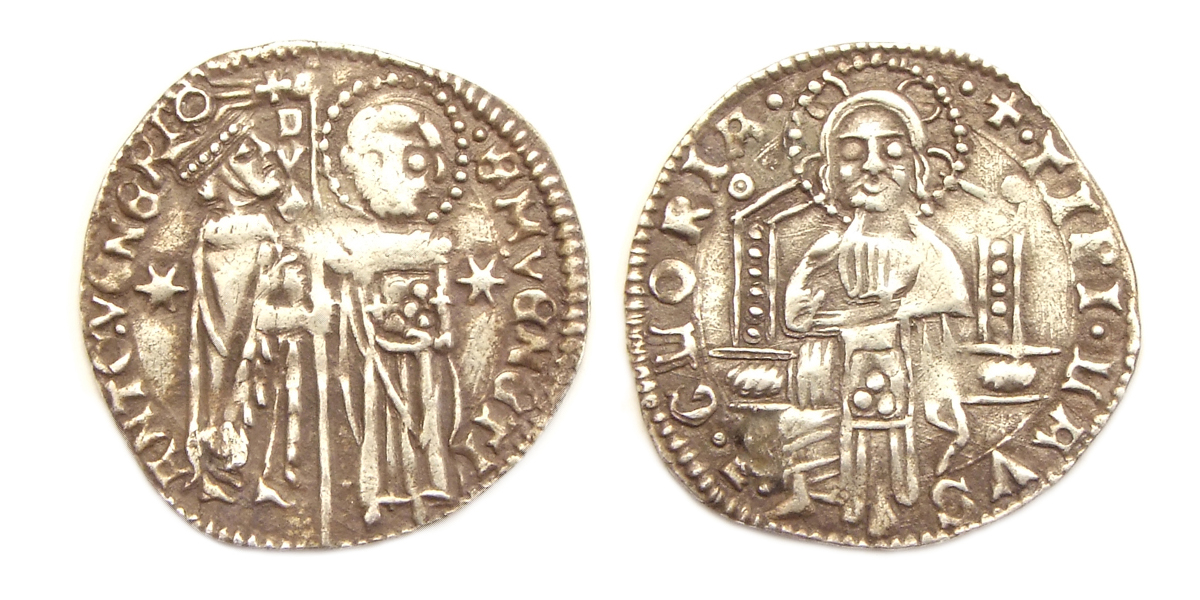
Republic of Venice, Grosso or 'Matapan' of Antonio Venier, Doge of Venice (1382-1400)

Other Italian mints followed the example of Venice by issuing their own grossi. Verona, Bologna, Reggio, Parma and Pavia all had coins of pure silver with weights roughly that of the Venetian grosso by 1230. The Roman Senate struck grossi in the mid 13th century, but by then it was the Venetian grosso which had become a major trade currency. Indeed, in the 13th century, Martino da Canale claimed the Venetian grosso was "current throughout the world on account of its good quality". That brought imitations and counterfeits, especially in the Balkans. In 1282, Venice imposed restrictions on its Dalmatian possessions prohibiting the use of copies of the grosso. By 1304, the Byzantine empire issued the basilikon, whose weight and fineness made it essentially interchangeable with the Venetian grosso and whose types were clearly inspired by it.

More than that, the Venetian grosso is the most prominent division point between the coinage system of Western Europe based on the penny and the era of larger silver and gold coins, collectively called groats and florins. Like the Venetian grosso, these larger denomination coins did not have names or inscriptions implying a fixed value in terms of the system of pounds, shillings and pence (or lira, soldi and denari in Italian) in which accounts were kept. This allowed the government to manipulate the values of its coins in terms of money of account as a tool for fiscal policy.

== See also ==
- Coinage of the Republic of Venice
- History of coins in Italy
- Gros (coinage)
- Groat (coin)
- Groschen
- Kuruş
