= Debasement =

Practice of lowering the intrinsic value of coins

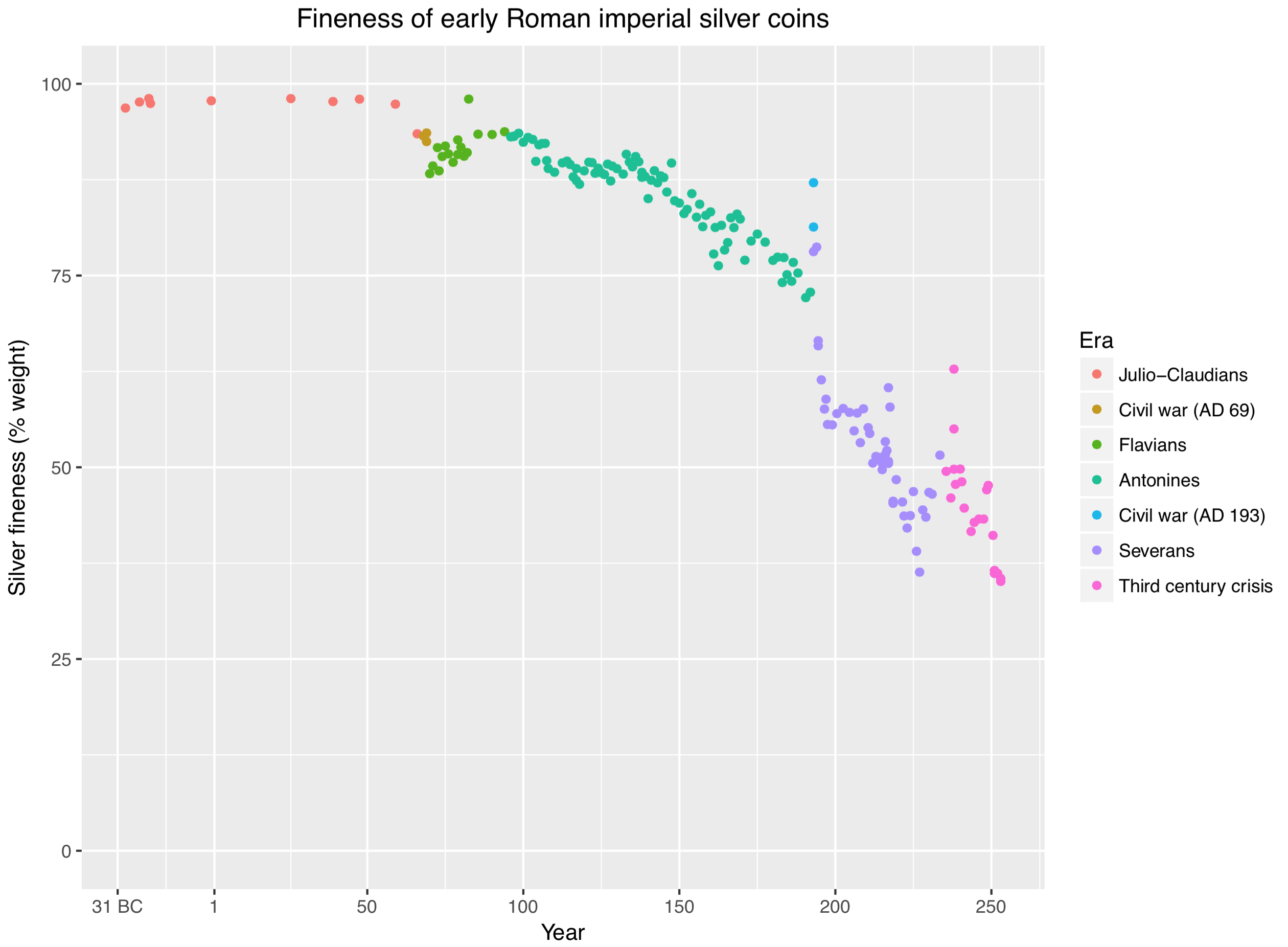
Starting with Nero in AD 64, the Romans continuously debased their silver coins until, by the end of the 3rd century, hardly any silver was left.

A debasement of coinage is the practice of lowering the intrinsic value of coins, especially when used in connection with commodity money, such as gold or silver coins, while continuing to circulate them at face value. A coin is said to be debased if the quantity of gold, silver, copper or nickel in the coin is reduced.

== Examples ==
=== Roman Empire ===
In Roman currency, the value of the denarius was gradually decreased over time as the Roman government altered both the size and the silver content of the coin. Originally, the silver used was nearly pure, weighing about 4.5 grams. From time to time, this was reduced. During the Julio-Claudian dynasty, the denarius contained approximately 4 grams of silver, and then was reduced to 3.8 grams under Nero. The denarius continued to shrink in size and purity, until by the second half of the third century, it was only about 2% silver, and was replaced by the Argenteus.

=== Ottoman Empire ===
Weight of akçe in grams of silver and index.

Year	Silver (g)	Index
1450–60	0.85	100
1490–1500	0.68	80
1600	0.29	34
1700	0.13	15
1800	0.048	6

=== Siam and Thailand ===
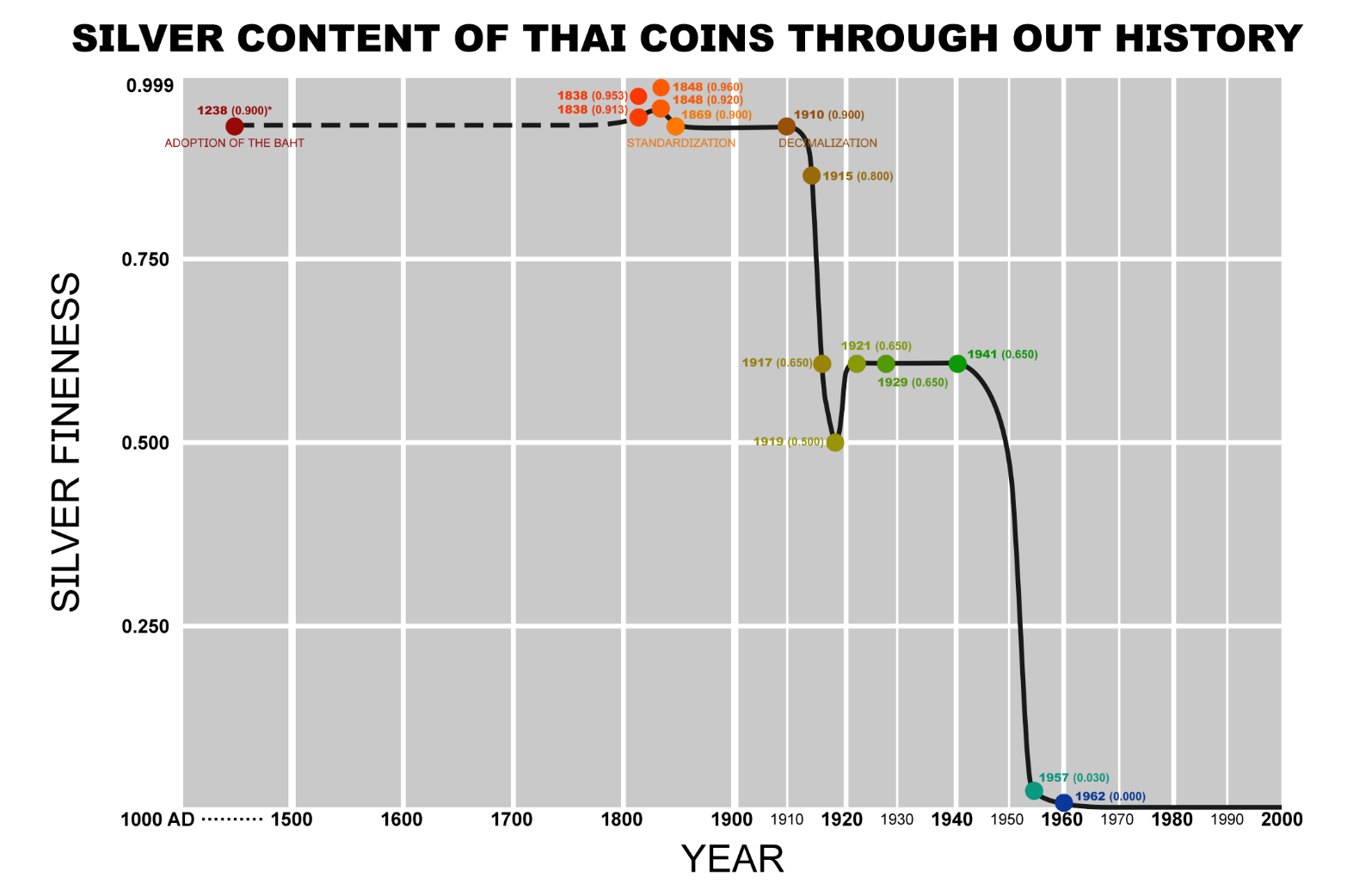
Debasement of Thai Currency

Silver was used extensively in Siamese currency from the medieval period until the 20th century. The baht originated as a traditional unit of weight and early Siamese photduang, or bullet money, consisted largely of silver. Although these early issues were generally of high purity, their fineness was not uniformly fixed at .900 throughout the entire period from the 13th century onward.

By the late 19th and early 20th centuries, machine-struck 1-baht coins were commonly issued in silver of approximately .900 fineness. These coins weighed about 15 grams and contained approximately 13.5 grams of fine silver.

Siam's use of silver coinage should be distinguished from its monetary standard. During the late 19th century, the international value of the baht was strongly influenced by the price of silver. Following a decline in silver prices, the Siamese government gradually restricted the free coinage of silver and moved toward a gold-based monetary system. The Gold Standard Act of 1908 formally established a gold standard and stabilized the baht against sterling. Silver coins nevertheless continued to circulate afterward.

During the First World War, increases in the market price of silver created difficulties for the government, as the bullion value of some coins approached their nominal value. The silver content of the 25-satang and 50-satang coins was therefore progressively reduced. These subsidiary denominations were issued at approximately .800 fineness in 1915, subsequently reduced to approximately .650, and briefly reduced further to .500 in 1919. The .650 standard was restored from 1920.

The 1-baht coin did not undergo the same sequence of debasements. It continued to be struck in approximately .900 silver until the final regular silver issues of the reign of Vajiravudh. Rising silver prices encouraged the hoarding, export and melting of silver coins, and the government introduced restrictions on their export. In 1918, the silver 1-baht coin was withdrawn from regular circulation and the denomination was increasingly represented by 1-baht banknotes.

Lower-denomination silver coins continued to be issued. During the reign of Prajadhipok, 25-satang and 50-satang coins dated 1929 were struck in .650 silver. Silver was also used for some smaller denominations during the early reign of Ananda Mahidol, including 5- and 10-satang coins dated 1941 and a 20-satang coin dated 1942, also at approximately .650 fineness.

During and after the Second World War, silver was progressively replaced by less expensive metals such as tin and aluminium bronze. As a result, Thai circulating coins increasingly became token coinage, in which the face value was substantially greater than the intrinsic value of the metal.

Silver briefly returned to the 1-baht denomination in 1957, when a new coin was issued in a billon alloy containing only .030 silver, or 3%. The coin weighed approximately 7.15 grams and therefore contained only about 0.21 grams of fine silver. This was substantially less than the approximately 13.5 grams of silver contained in the earlier .900-fine baht coins.

The remaining silver content was subsequently eliminated. Copper-nickel baht coins appeared in the early 1960s, and the regular 1962 1-baht coin contained no silver. The year 1962 therefore marks the effective end of silver in regular Thai baht coinage, rather than Thailand's abandonment of the silver monetary standard, which had occurred much earlier during the transition to the gold standard in the early 20th century.

== Effects ==
Debasement lowers the intrinsic value of the coinage and so more coins can be made with the same quantity of precious metal. If done too frequently, debasement may lead to a new coin being adopted as a standard currency, as when the Ottoman akçe was replaced by the kuruş (1 kuruş = 120 akçe), with the para (1/40 kuruş) as a subunit. The kuruş in turn later became a subdivision of the lira.

== Methods ==
An administrative method to debase currency is for the mint to start issuing coins of a certain face value, but with less metal content than previous issues. There will be an incentive to bring the old coins to the mint for re-minting – see Gresham's law. A revenue, called seigniorage, is made on this minting process.

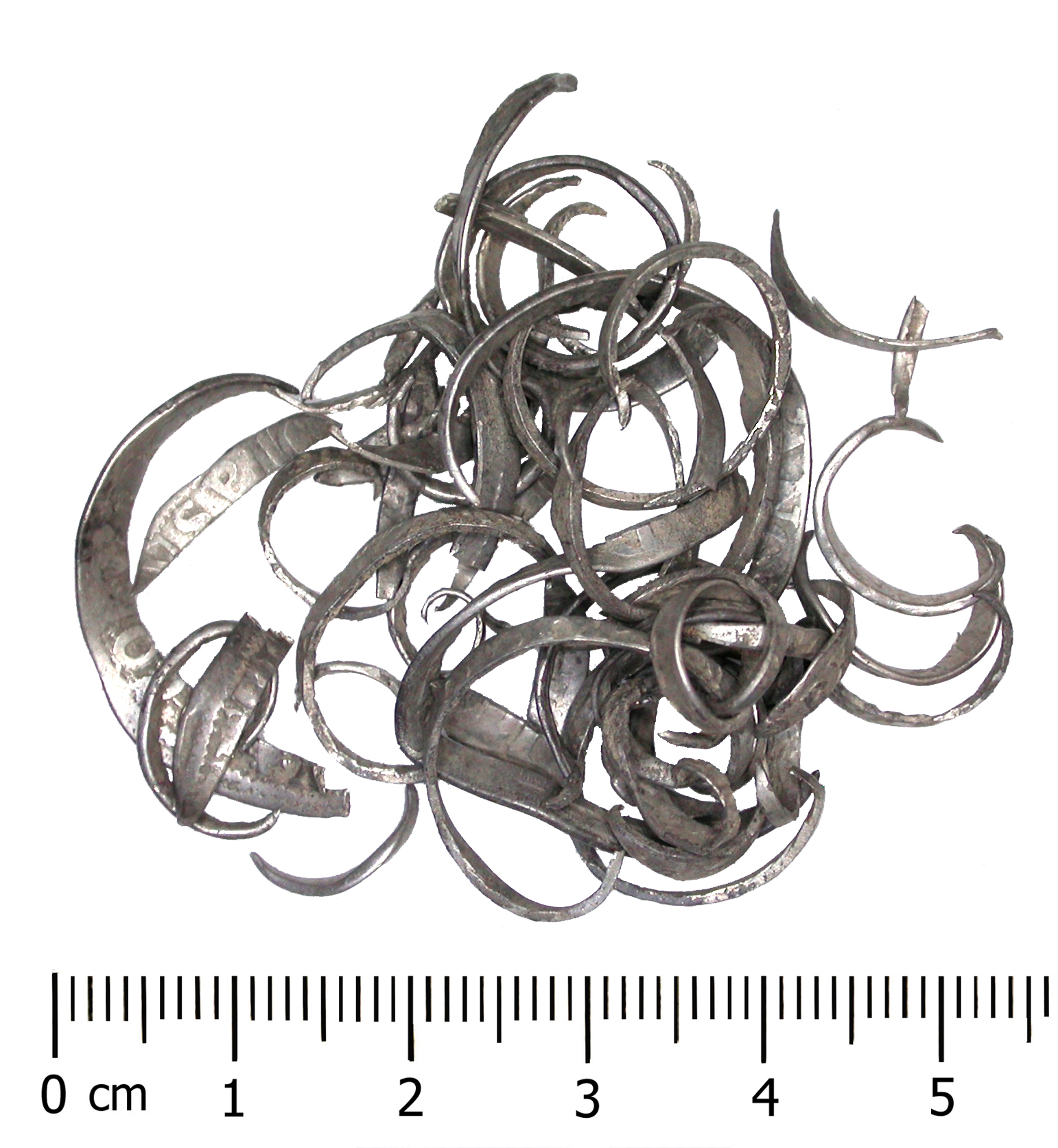
A 16th or 17th century hoard of coin clippings discovered in Derbyshire and recorded in the Portable Antiquities Scheme.

When done by an individual, precious metal was physically removed from the coin, which could then be passed on at the original face value, leaving the debaser with a profit. This physical debasement was effected by several methods, including clipping (shaving metal from the coin's circumference) and sweating (shaking the coins in a bag and collecting the dust worn off).

Until the mid-20th century, coins were often made of silver or (rarely) gold, which were quite soft and prone to wear. This meant coins naturally got lighter (and thus less valuable) as they aged, so coins that had lost a small amount of bullion would go unnoticed. Modern coins used as currency are made of hard, cheap metals such as steel, copper, or a copper-nickel alloy, reducing wear and making it difficult and unprofitable to debase them.

=== Coin clipping ===
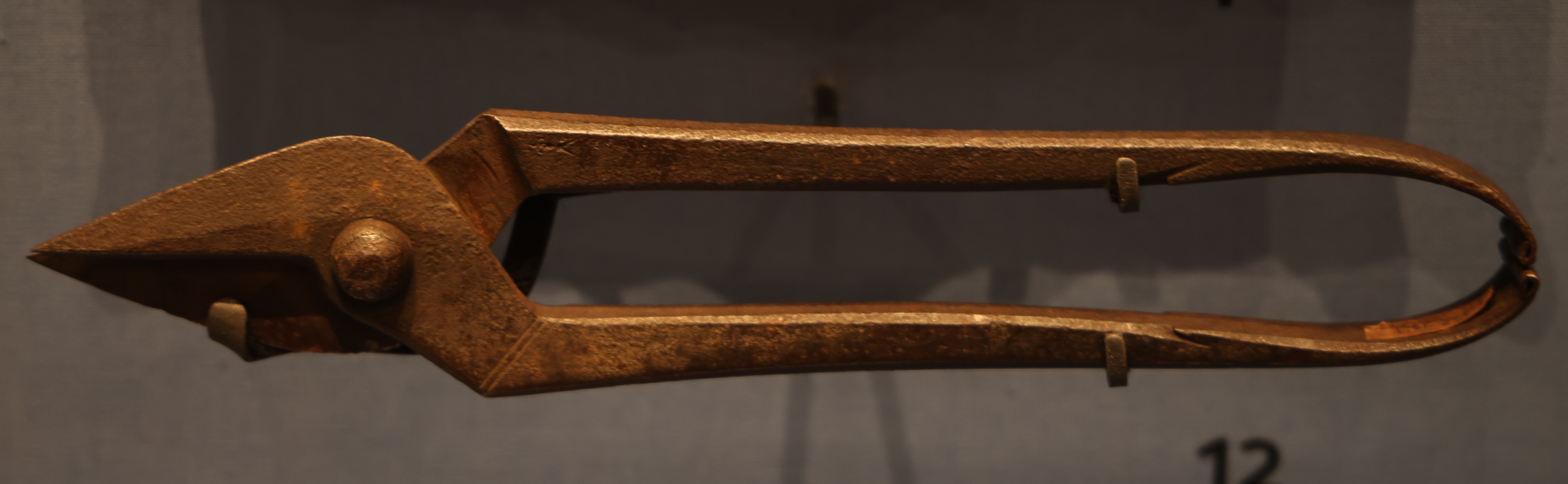
Shears used for coin clipping in the 17th century

Clipping is shaving off a small portion of a precious metal coin for profit. The precious metal clippings are saved up and melted into bullion or used to make new coins.

Coin clipping was usually considered by the law to be of a similar magnitude to counterfeiting, and was occasionally punished by death, a fate which befell English counterfeiters Thomas Rogers and Anne Rogers in 1690, and Edmund Robinson, the curate of Holmfirth in Yorkshire, at around the same date. Even among pirates, clipping coins was considered a serious breach of trust. Henry Avery's pirate fleet attacked the treasure ship Gunsway in 1695 and netted one of the largest pirate captures in history. When fellow pirate William May's crew were found to have traded clipped coins to Avery's crew, Avery took back nearly all the treasure he had shared with May and his men and sent them away.

Coin clipping is why many coins have the rim of the coin marked with stripes (milling or reeding), text (engraving) or some other pattern that would be destroyed if the coin were clipped. This practice is attributed to Isaac Newton, who was appointed Master of the Royal Mint 1699. Although most modern fiat coins are unprofitable to clip, modern milling can be a deterrent to counterfeiting, an aid to the blind to distinguish different denominations, or purely decorative.

Comparison of unclipped and clipped Siliqua from the Hoxne Hoard
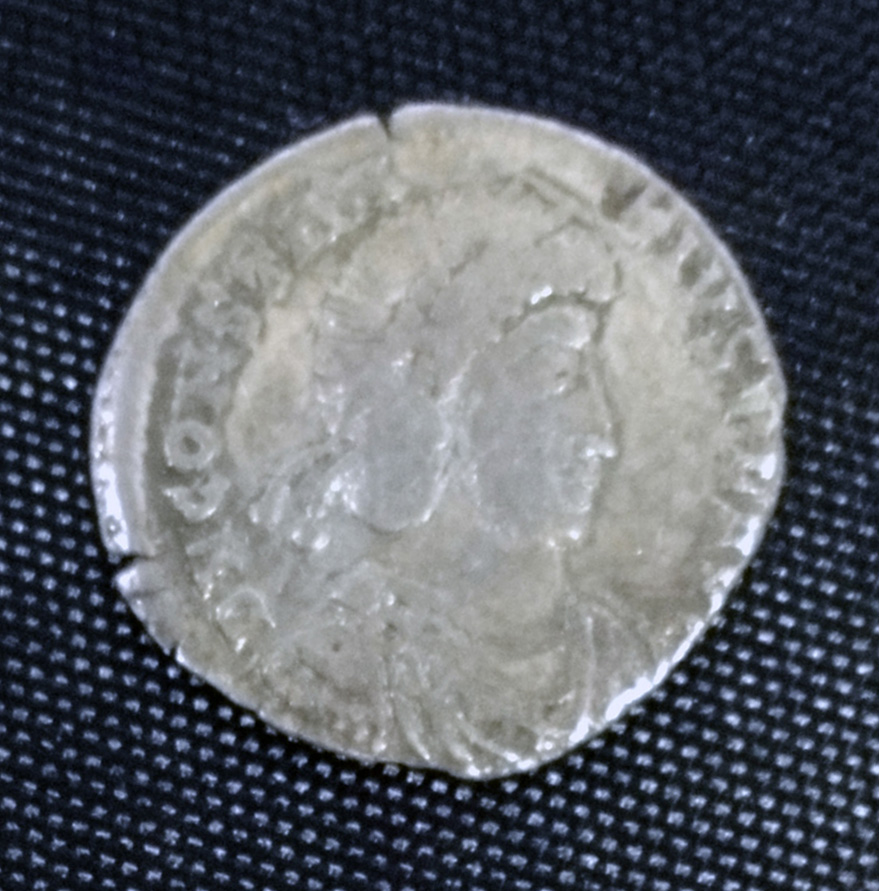
An unclipped siliqua

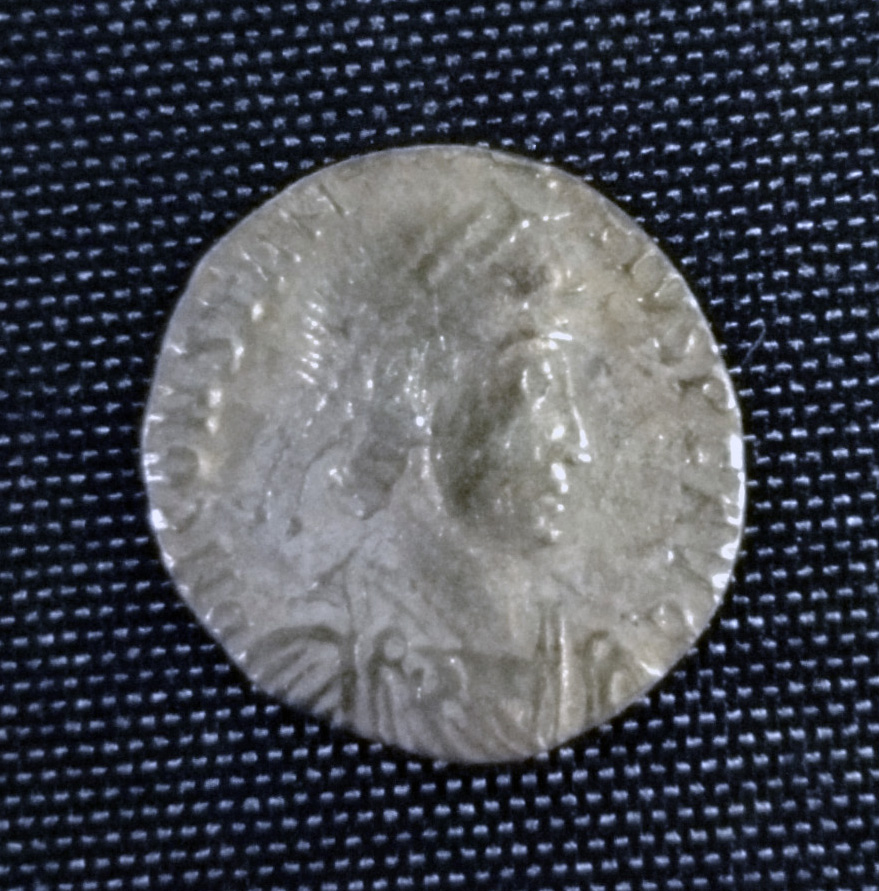
A clipped siliqua

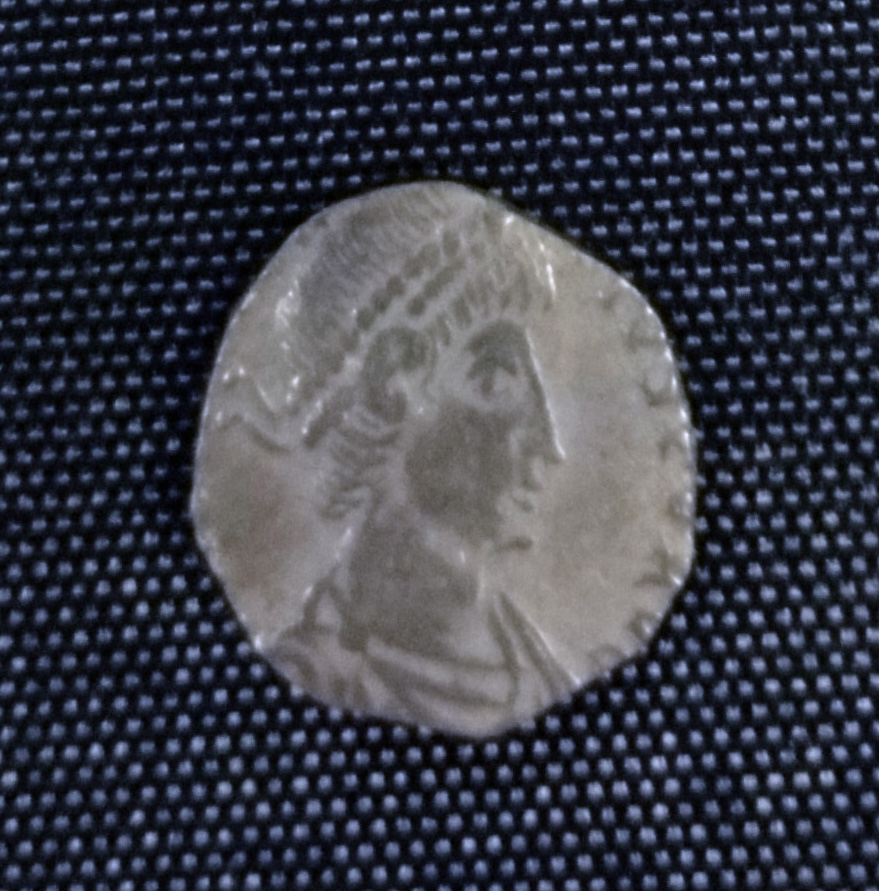
A further clipped siliqua

=== Sweating ===
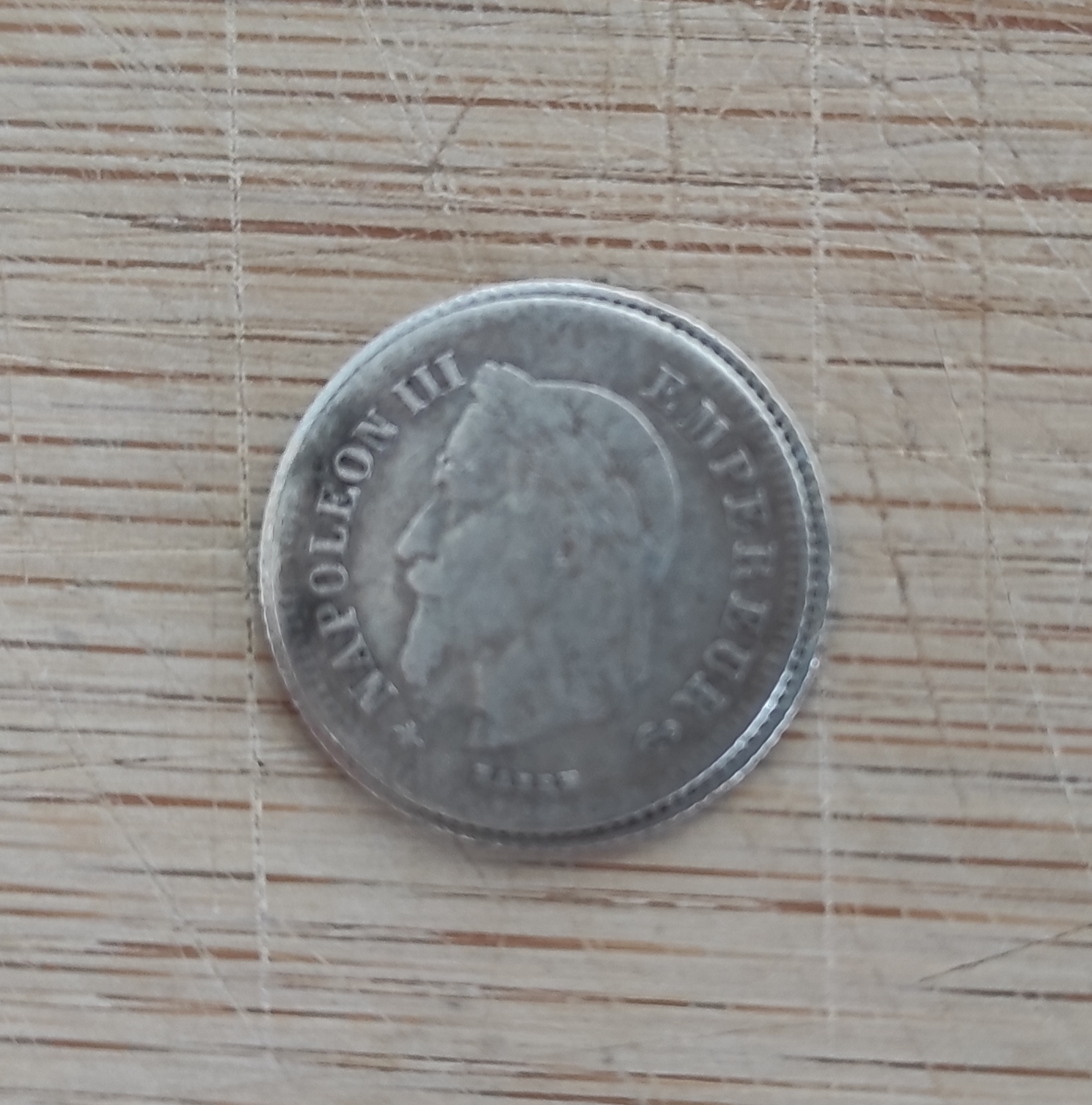
Modern example of a sweated silver coin

In the process of sweating, coins were placed in a bag and shaken. The bits of metal that had worn off the coins were recovered from the bottom of the bag. Sweating tended to wear the coin in a more natural way than clipping, and so was harder to detect.

Records from the nineteenth-century trade between Hamburg and Lübeck describe several suspected cases in which mixed batches of gold coins lost weight with an unusual degree of consistency, which contemporaries took as deliberate tampering.

=== Plugging ===
If the coin was large, a hole could be punched out of the middle, and the face of the coin hammered to close up the hole. Or the coin could be sawn in half, and a plug of metal extracted from the interior. After filling the hole with a cheaper metal, the two halves would be welded together again. Verbal references to plugged quarters and plugged dimes eventually yielded the common phrase "not worth a plugged nickel" (or 'plug nickel', or even a plugged cent), emphasizing the worthlessness of such a tampered coin.

== Related uses ==
- "Debasement" is also sometimes used to refer to the tendency of silver or gold coins to be "shaved", that is, to have small amounts shaved off the edges of the coins by unscrupulous users, thereby reducing the actual precious metal content of the coin. In order to prevent this, silver and gold coins began to be produced with milled edges, as many coins still do by tradition, although they no longer contain valuable metals. For example, the U.S. quarter and dime have milled edges. Coins that have traditionally been made purely of base metals, such as the U.S. nickel or the penny, are more likely to have unmilled edges.
- By analogy, "debased currency" is sometimes used for anything whose value has been reduced, such as "Stardom is an utterly debased currency"

== See also ==
- Devaluation
- Inflation
- Inflationism
- Inflation hedge
- Financial repression, similar process via different mechanism
- Money burning
- William Wood, center of a political controversy involving the possible debasement of coins
- Shrinkflation
