= Kuruş =

Subunit of Turkish Lira

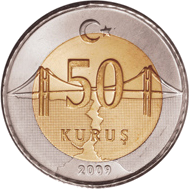
Current Turkish 50 kuruş coin

Kuruş (/kəˈruːʃ/ kə-ROOSH; Turkish pronunciation: [kuˈɾuʃ]), also gurush, ersh, gersh, grush, grosha, and grosi, are all names for currency denominations in and around the territories formerly part of the Ottoman Empire. The variation in the name stems from the different languages it is used in (Arabic, Amharic, Turkish, and Greek) and the different transcriptions into the Latin alphabet. In European languages, the kuruş was known as the piastre.

Today the kuruş (pl. kuruşlar) is a Turkish currency subunit, with one Turkish lira equal to 100 kuruş as of the 2005 revaluation of the lira. Until the 1844 subdivision of the former Ottoman gold lira, the kuruş was the standard unit of currency within the Ottoman Empire, and was subdivided into 40 para or 120 akçe. One kuruş remained equal to 40 para during the First Turkish lira, said lira lasting from 1923 till its 2005's revaluation.

== Name ==
The Turkish word kuruş (Ottoman Turkish: قروش, kurûş); Greek: γρόσι, grosi; plural γρόσια, grosia) is derived from the French gros ("heavy"), which itself is derived from the Latin grossus ("thick"). It is cognate with the German Groschen, Polish grosz and Hungarian garas.

== History ==
The Ottoman kuruş was introduced in 1688. It was initially a large silver piece (similar to the European thalers issued by the Ottomans), approximately equal to the French écu, or, from other sources, to the Spanish dollar. It was worth 40 para. In 1844, following sustained debasement, the gold lira was introduced, worth 100 kuruş. During the late 18th to early 19th centuries it was further reduced to a billon coin weighing less than 3 grams.

As the Ottoman Empire broke up, several successor states retained the kuruş as a denomination. These included Egypt, Saudi Arabia, Syria, Lebanon and Turkey itself. Others, including Jordan and Sudan, adopted the kuruş as a denomination when they established their own currencies.

At the beginning of the 19th century, silver coins were in circulation for 1 akçe, 1, 5, 10 and 20 para, 1, 2 and 2 1/2 kuruş, together with gold coins denominated in zeri mahbub (3,5 kurush) and altin. As the silver coins were debased, other denominations appeared: 30 para, 1 1/2, 3, 5 and 6 kuruş. The final coinage issued before the currency reform consisted of billon 1, 10 and 20 para, and silver 1 1/2, 3 and 6 kuruş.

In 1844, the Turkish gold lira was introduced as the new standard denomination. It was divided into 100 silver kuruş and the kuruş continued to circulate until the 1970s.

Kuruş eventually became obsolete due to the chronic inflation in Turkey in the late 1970s. A currency reform on 1 January 2005 provided its return as 1/100 of the new lira.

== See also ==
- Groschen
- Gros (coinage)
- Groat (coin)
- Venetian grosso
- Ottoman lira
- Turkish lira
- Egyptian pound
- Jordanian dinar
- Palestine pound
- Saudi riyal
- Sudanese pound

== Bibliography ==
- Krause, Chester L.; Clifford Mishler (1991). Standard Catalog of World Coins: 1801–1991 (18th ed.). Krause Publications. ISBN 0873411501.
