= Basilikon =

14th-century Byzantine silver coin

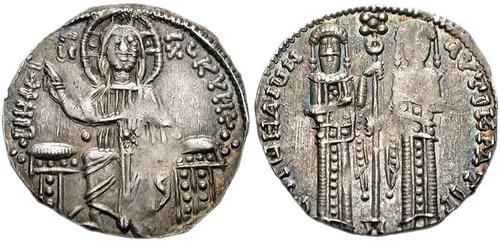
One of the first basilika issued, with a seated Christ and the standing figures of Andronikos II and Michael IX holding a labarum between them. The legend reads Θεέ βοήθει αὐτοκράατορες Ῥωμαίων ('God aid the emperors of the Romans').

The basilikon (Byzantine Greek: βασιλικόν [νόμισμα], 'imperial [coin]'), commonly also referred to as the doukaton (δουκάτον), was a widely circulated Byzantine silver coin of the first half of the 14th century. Its introduction marked the return to a wide-scale use of silver coinage in the Byzantine Empire, and presaged the total abandonment of the gold coins around the middle of the century.

== History ==
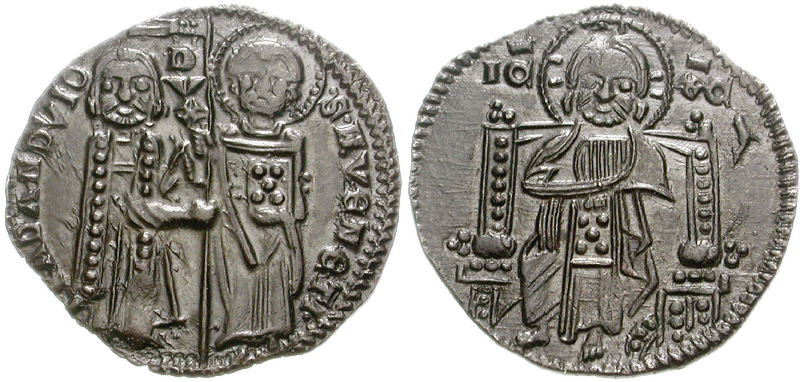
Silver Venetian grosso (Matapan) of Francesco Dandolo, ca. 1328. The similarity of the iconography with the basilikon is evident.

The basilikon was introduced shortly before 1304 by Emperor Andronikos II Palaiologos (r. 1282–1328), in direct imitation of the Venetian silver ducat or grosso, chiefly to pay the mercenaries of the Catalan Company. The Byzantine coin closely followed the iconography of the Venetian model, with a seated Christ on the obverse and the two standing figures of Andronikos II and his son and co-emperor Michael IX Palaiologos (r. 1294–1320) replacing St. Mark and the Doge of Venice on the reverse. The similarity was reinforced by the name of the new coin: the ducato, the "coin of the doge", became the basilikon, the "coin of the basileus", although the contemporary Greek sources usually call both doukaton.

The basilikon was of high-grade silver (0.920), flat and not concave (scyphate) as other Byzantine coins, weighing 2.2 grams and officially traded at a rate of 1 to 12 with the gold hyperpyron or two keratia, the traditional rate for Byzantine silver coinage since the days of the hexagram and the miliaresion. The actual rate, however, was usually lower, and fluctuated depending on the changing price of silver: contemporary sources indicate actual rates of 12.5, 13, or 15 basilika to the hyperpyron. Examples of half-basilika are also known to have been minted.

In the 1330s and 1340s, however, the basilikon's weight was much reduced, as a result of a silver shortage affecting all of Europe and the Mediterranean, falling to 1.25 grams by the late 1340s. It ceased to be struck in the 1350s, and was replaced circa 1367 with the new, heavier stavraton.
