= Gros (coinage) =

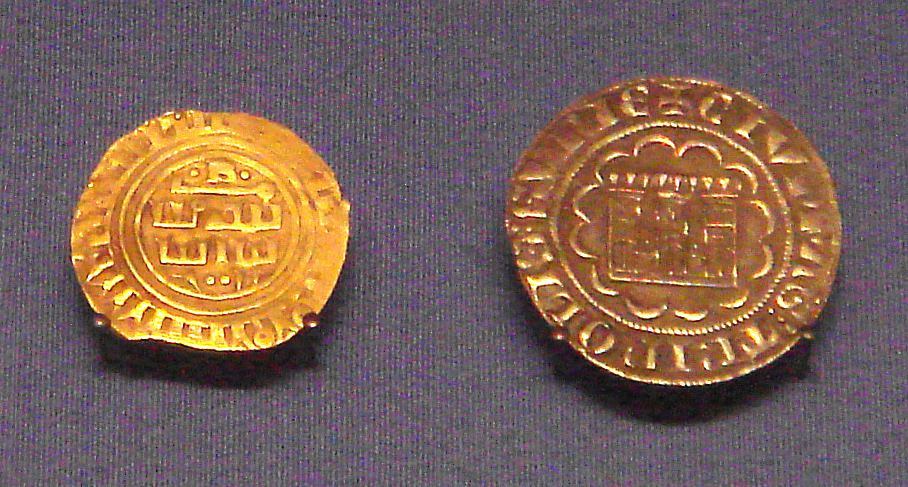
County of Tripoli gold bezant in Arabic (1270-1300), and Tripoli silver gros (1275-1287). British Museum.

A gros was a type of silver coinage of France from the time of Saint Louis. There were gros tournois and gros parisis. The gros was sub-divided in half gros and quarter gros. The original gros created by St Louis weighed about 4.52 g of nearly pure silver, and was valued at one sou, that is 12 deniers or 1/20 of a livre tournois. Unlike the gold écu that was minted in small numbers, mostly for prestige reasons, the gros was a very common coin, and very widely copied by non royal mints.

== See also ==
- Groschen
- Groat (coin)
- Kuruş
- Venetian grosso
