= Sequin (coin) =

Venetian gold coin

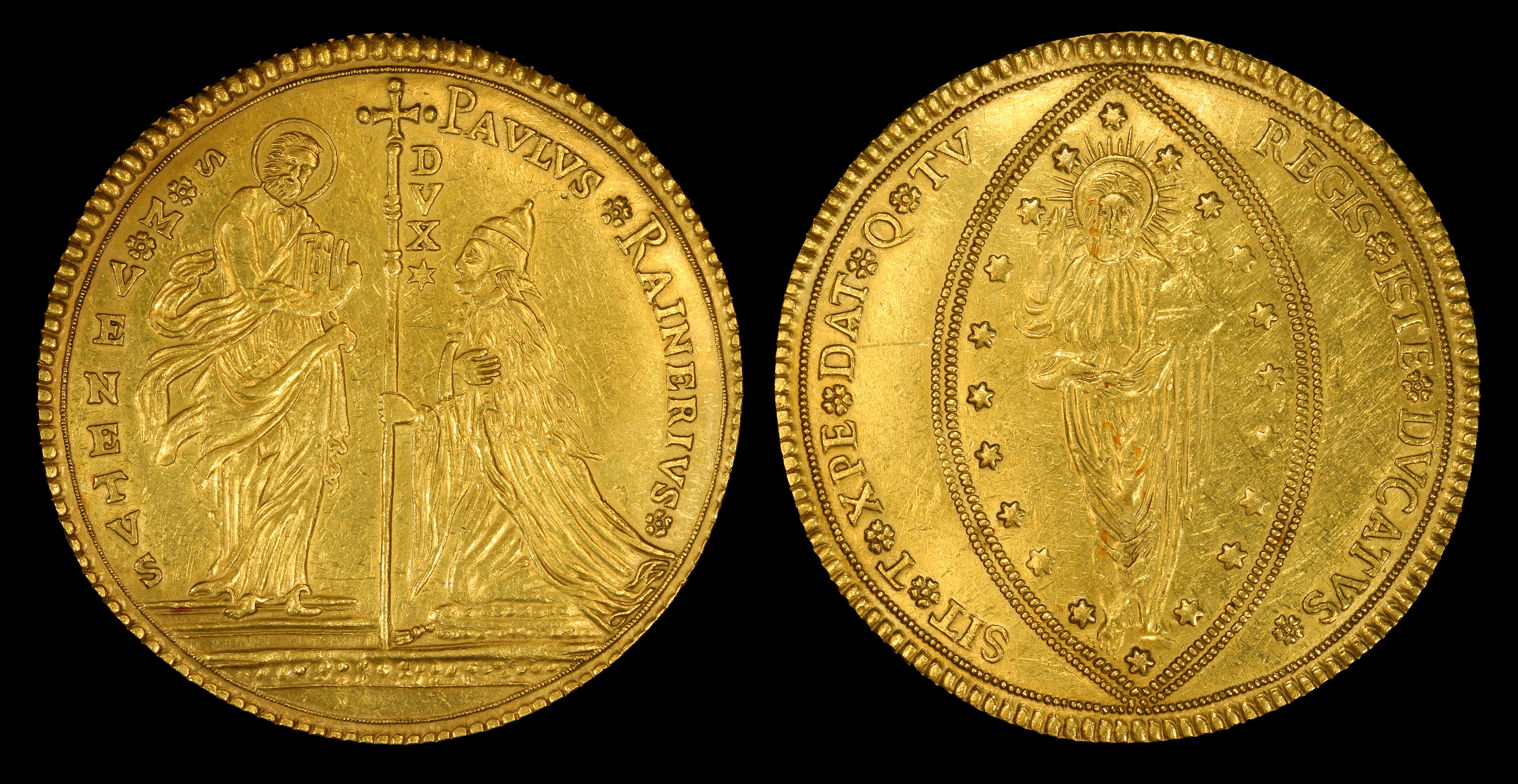
50 zecchini from the reign of Paolo Renier (1779–89), penultimate Doge of Venice. This denomination (on average) weighs 192.5 grams (6.19 ozt) and measures 76 millimetres (3.0 in).

The sequin (/ˈsiːkwɪn/ SEE-kwin) or zechin (Venetian: [(d)zeˈkiŋ]; Italian: zecchino [tsekˈkiːno, dzekˈkiːno]) was a gold coin minted by the Republic of Venice from 1284.

The design of the zecchino remained unchanged for over 500 years, from its introduction in 1284 to the takeover of Venice by Napoleon in 1797. The reverse bears a motto in Latin hexameter: Sit tibi, Christe, datus // quem tū regis, iste ducātus ("Christ, let this duchy that you rule be given to you").

The coin was originally referred to as a ducat (ducal coin), but there were also silver ducats, so in order to distinguish them the gold ducat was called the ducato de zecca, i.e. ducat of the mint, and this was then shortened to zecchino and corrupted to “sequin”.

== History ==
The coin was initially called the "ducat" (ducato), after the ruling Doge of Venice who was prominently depicted on it. From 1543, it was called the zecchino, after the Zecca (mint) of Venice. The name of the mint ultimately derives from Arabic: سكّة (sikka), meaning a coin mould or die.

In some regions, in later centuries, this type of coin was stitched to women's clothing such as headdresses – this eventually led to the origin of the more modern word "sequins" to denote small shiny, circular decorations.

This Venetian coin was imitated throughout the Mediterranean—by the Byzantine basilikon (c. 1304), the Ottoman Empire (1478), and the Knights Hospitaller of Malta (1535). The Ottoman and the Maltese coins were also gold.

== See also ==
- History of coins in Italy
- Sequin
