= Miliaresion =

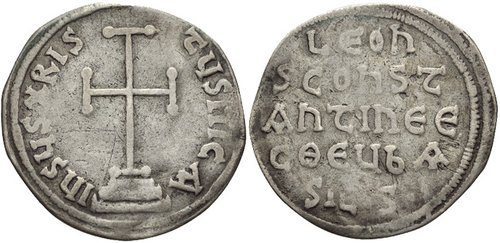
Example of the first miliaresia, struck by Leo III (r. 717–741) to celebrate the coronation of his son, Constantine V (r. 741–775), as co-emperor. Notice the lack of any imagery except the cross.

The miliaresion (Greek: μιλιαρήσιον, from Latin: miliarensis), is a name used for two types of Byzantine silver coins. In its most usual sense, it refers to the themed flat silver coin struck between the 8th and 11th Century.

== History ==
Originally, the name was given to a series of silver coins issued in the 4th century that were struck 72 to the pound and were the equivalent of 1,000 nummi. Thereafter and until the 7th century, the Byzantines did not regularly circulate silver coins, although there were a very small number of commemorative issues struck. In the 7th century, a miliaresion was an alternative name possibly given to a variation on the short-lived hexagram coin minted during the time of Heraclius and Constans II. From c. 720, this variant coin, broader and thinner than the hexagram, was instituted by Leo III the Isaurian (r. 717–741).

The new coin, for which the term miliaresion is usually preserved among numismatists, was apparently struck 144 to the pound, with an initial weight of circa 2.27 grams, although in the Macedonian period that increased to 3.03 grams (i.e. 108 coins to the pound). The design of the coins bears a striking resemblance to a series of silver coins minted in the previous century by the Persian Sassanid Empire, which were later copied by the Islamic Umayyad Caliphate. It is from the latter's influence that it seems the Byzantines drew inspiration to adopt the new design, particularly in light of the Isaurian dynasty's iconoclastic policies. Like the contemporary silver dirham of the Caliphate, the miliaresion featured initially no human representations, sporting instead the names and titles of a single emperor or emperors on the reverse and a cross on steps on the obverse.

In the first century of the miliaresion's issue, it appears to have been struck solely as a ceremonial coin on the occasion of the appointment of a co-emperor, and hence always features the names of two Byzantine emperors. Only from the reign of Emperor Theophilos (r. 829–842) did the coin become regular issue, struck throughout an emperor's reign. In the 10th century, Emperor Alexander (r. 912–913) introduced a bust of Christ on the obverse, and Romanos I (r. 920–944) added an imperial bust to the center of the cross. Shortly thereafter, the earlier cross potent of Late Antiquity was transformed into a newer, radiant cross-crosslet, often with flanking portraits of the reigning co-emperors (such as those found on the miliaresia of Romanos I and Constantine VII, or those of Basil II and his brother Constantine VIII). The transformation continued in the mid-11th century, when images of an emperor, Christ, and the Theotokos all appeared on the coin together. By the mid- 1060s, the diversity of the images culminated in several examples depicting a reigning empress appearing alongside her emperor, which appears to have begun under Constantine X Doukas and Eudokia Makrembolitissa, due to the latter's heavy influence on the court.

However, by the middle of the 11th century, due to a debasement of the currency begun by Romanos III Argyros, ^{2}/_{3} and ^{1}/_{3} fractions of the miliaresion also began to be minted, and the military and financial collapse that occurred primarily under the Doukas dynasty in the 1060s and 1070s severely affected the quality of the coin. By the 1080s, the coin fell out of prominence, and only a few rare examples exist from the reign of Alexios I Komnenos (r. 1081–1118). It was discontinued after 1092 (due to Alexios I's currency reform), but remained as a money of account, equal to ^{1}/_{12} of a nomisma. Following the reform, it was replaced by a low-grade billon trachy cup coin, initially worth a quarter of a miliaresion, but over the following century it was significantly devalued, especially after the collapse of the Komnenian dynasty following the death of Manuel I Komnenos in 1180. The miliaresion appears to have been mostly forgotten by the 13th century, especially after the Sack of Constantinople in 1204, but was in some ways revived in the form of the basilikon, a flat silver coin issued in the Palaiologan-era empire from roughly 1300 onward.

After the fall of the Byzantine Empire by the latter half of the 15th century, the name of the miliaresion survived as a relic in Western European languages, where the term milliarès was used for various kinds of Muslim silver coins.

== Gallery ==
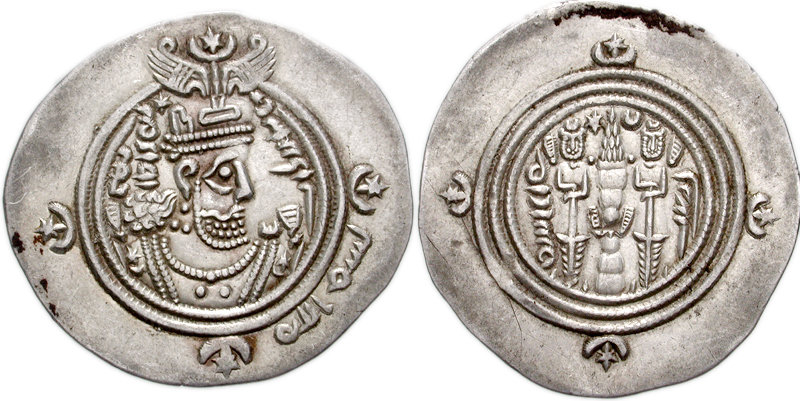
Rashidun imitation of a coin (c. 630) of Sassanid King Khosrow II. This transitional coin from the early years of the Caliphate illustrates some of the design features that appear to have inspired the Byzantine miliaresion.

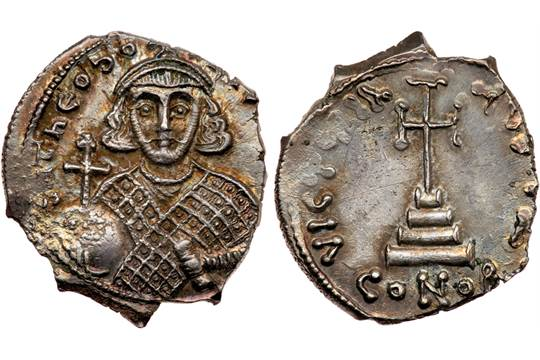
A rare example of a hexagram of Theodosius III (r. 715–717), struck just a few years prior to the introduction of the miliaresion. Note the design of the hexagram's cross which was carried through when designing the miliaresion's obverse.

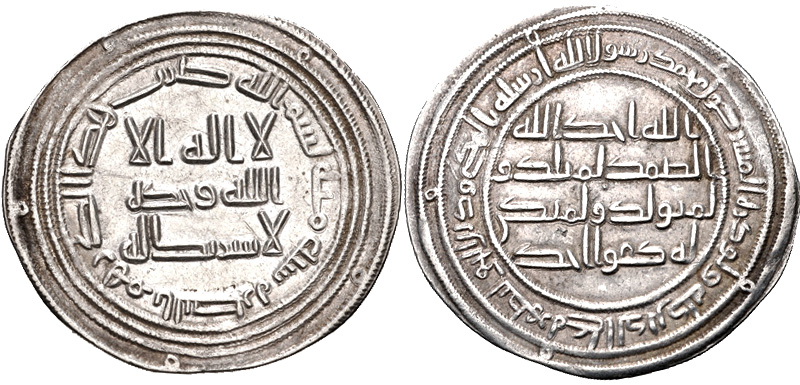
A dirham of Caliph Umar II (r. 717–720). Note the total lack of imagery on the coin. Size is approx. 25mm, and weighs 2.78 grams, both very close to its Byzantine counterpart. An important contemporary inspiration for Leo III's new coin.

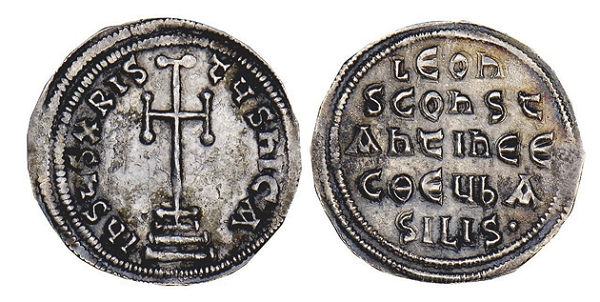
An early example of Leo III's new coin, the miliaresion. Note the similarities with the three preceding coins, namely: the concentric circular edging, the stylized standing cross, and the use of text and simple symbols with no human figures.

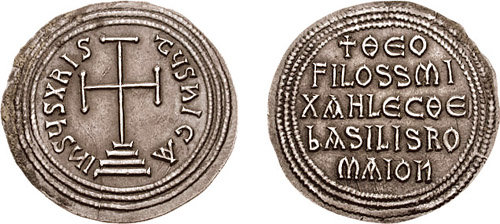
Miliaresion struck by Theophilos (r. 829–842) featuring the early cross potent design on the obverse begun by Leo III, with invocative phrasing on the reverse. This classic design persisted until the reign of Leo VI the Wise (r. 886–912).

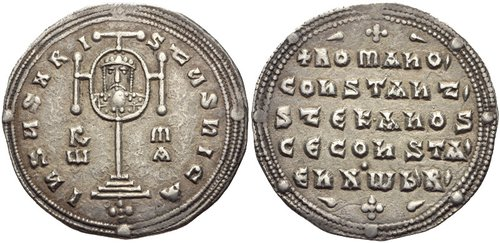
Miliaresion struck by Romanos I Lekapenos (r. 920–944), which modifies the classic design to include a miniature portrait within the center of the cross (obverse) and the names of the senior emperor and co-emperors, Constantine VII, Stephen and Constantine (reverse).

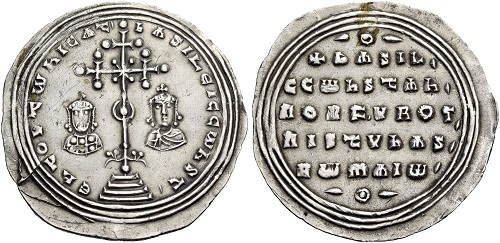
Miliaresion struck by Basil II (r. 976–1025), and Constantine VIII (r. 976–1028) featuring the radiant cross-crosslet design of the zenith of the Macedonian period. This new design first appeared by the end of the reign of Romanos I, and solidified under the sole rule of Constantine VII Porphyrogennetos.

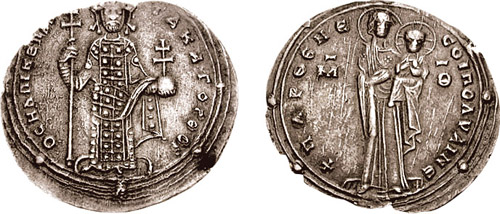
Miliaresion struck by Romanos III (r. 1028–1034), featuring a departure from the original cross and phrasing design, and instead portraying the Theotokos with the infant Christ on the obverse and the standing emperor dressed in imperial regalia on the reverse.

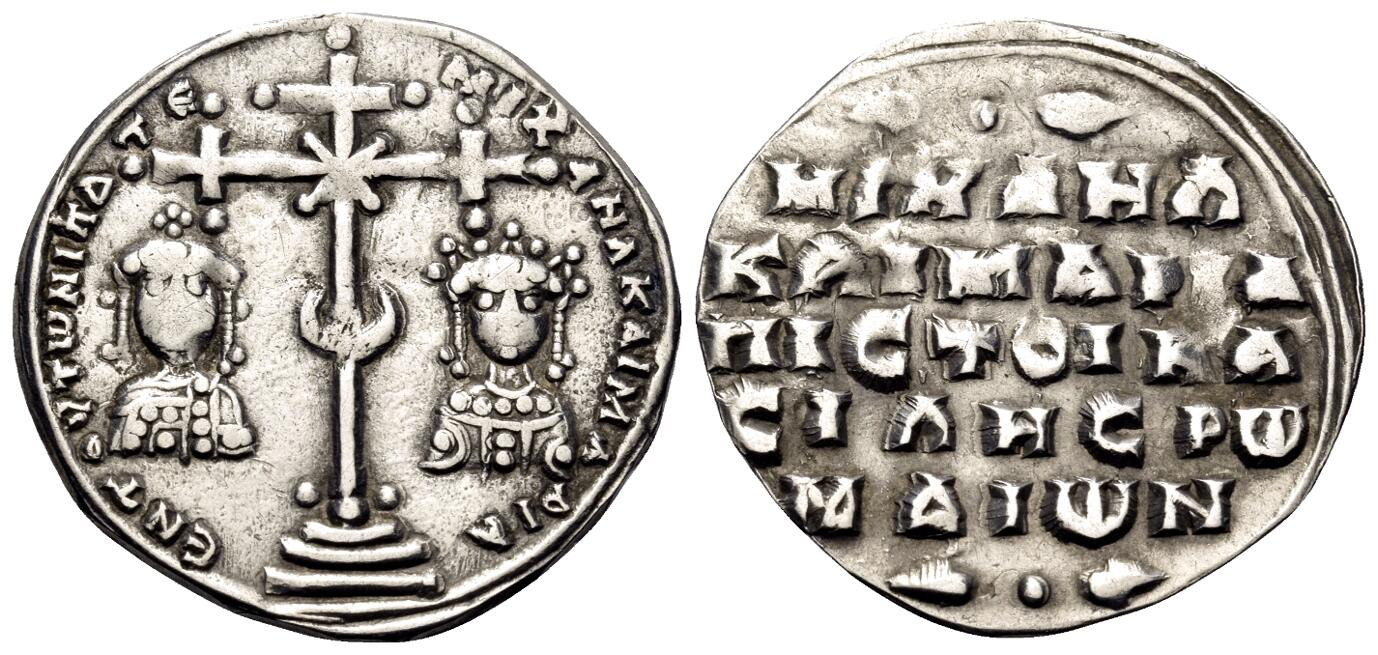
Miliaresion struck by Michael VII Doukas (r. 1071–1078) and his empress, Maria of Alania, again featuring a radiant cross-crosslet design. This is a rare example of an empress being portrayed on the same coin as a reigning emperor.

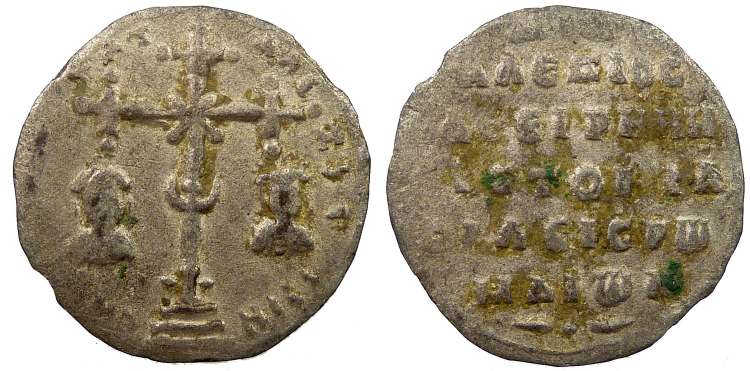
An extremely rare example of a miliaresion struck in the early years of the reign of Alexios I Komnenos (r. 1081–1118). A cross style and layout similar to the one used on Michael VII's miliaresion of the 1070s is used, and Alexios appears alongside his wife, Eirene Doukaina.

== Sources ==
- Grierson, Philip (1999). Byzantine Coinage (PDF). Washington, DC: Dumbarton Oaks. ISBN 978-0-88402-274-9. Archived from the original (PDF) on 2010-06-13.
- Kazhdan, Alexander, ed. (1991). The Oxford Dictionary of Byzantium. Oxford and New York: Oxford University Press. ISBN 0-19-504652-8.
