= Groat (English coin) =

Archaic English, Scottish and Irish coins worth 4 pence

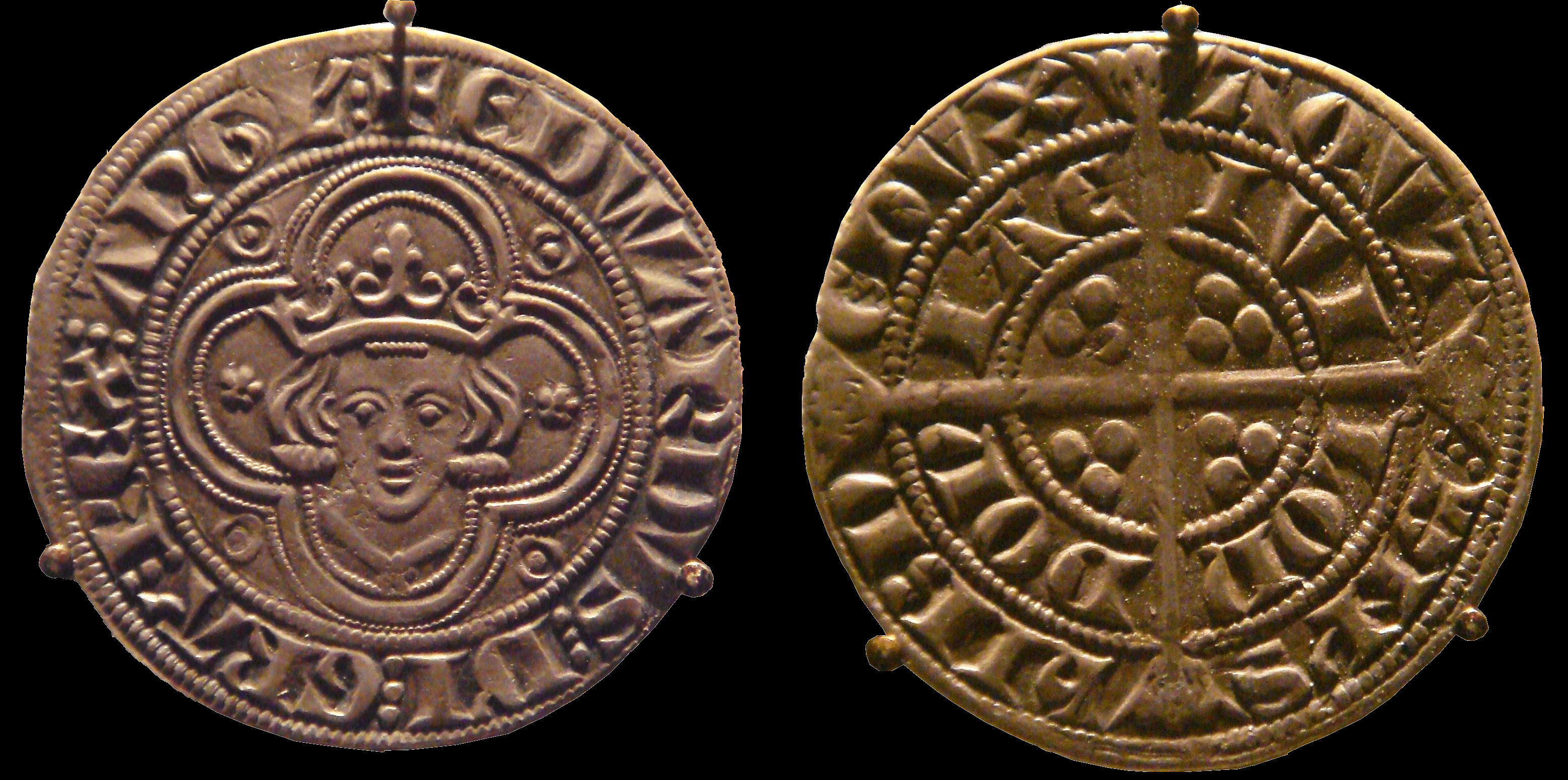
A silver groat from the reign of Edward I of England (1272–1307)

The groat is the traditional name of a defunct English and Irish silver coin worth four pence, and also a Scottish coin which was originally worth fourpence, with later issues being valued at eightpence and one shilling.

== Name ==
The name has also been applied to any thick or large coin, such as the Groschen (grosso), a silver coin issued by Tyrol in 1271 and Venice in the 13th century, which was the first of this general size to circulate in the Holy Roman Empire and other parts of Europe. The immediate ancestor to the groat was the French gros tournois or groat of Tours, which was known as the groot (Dutch for "great" or "large") in the Netherlands.

The name also refers to a range of other European coins such as those of the Italian peninsula known as a grosso including the grosso of Venice and the Kraków grosz in Poland. Marco Polo referred to the groat in recounts of his travels to East Asia when describing the currencies of the Yuan Empire. His descriptions were based on the conversion of 1 bezant = 20 groats = 133 1/3 tornesel.

== History ==
David II of Scotland
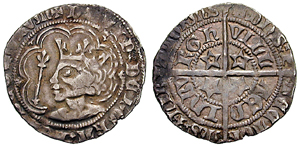
First side of the image: ++ david × rex × scotorvm Crowned bust left holding sceptre before; star at base of sceptre
Second side of the image: Outer circle: + dns ptector ms f libator ms; inner circle: vill a ed inbv rgh Long cross quartered with of five points mullets.
AR Groat (3.11 g). Light coinage, 1367–1371. Edinburgh mint.
Edward III
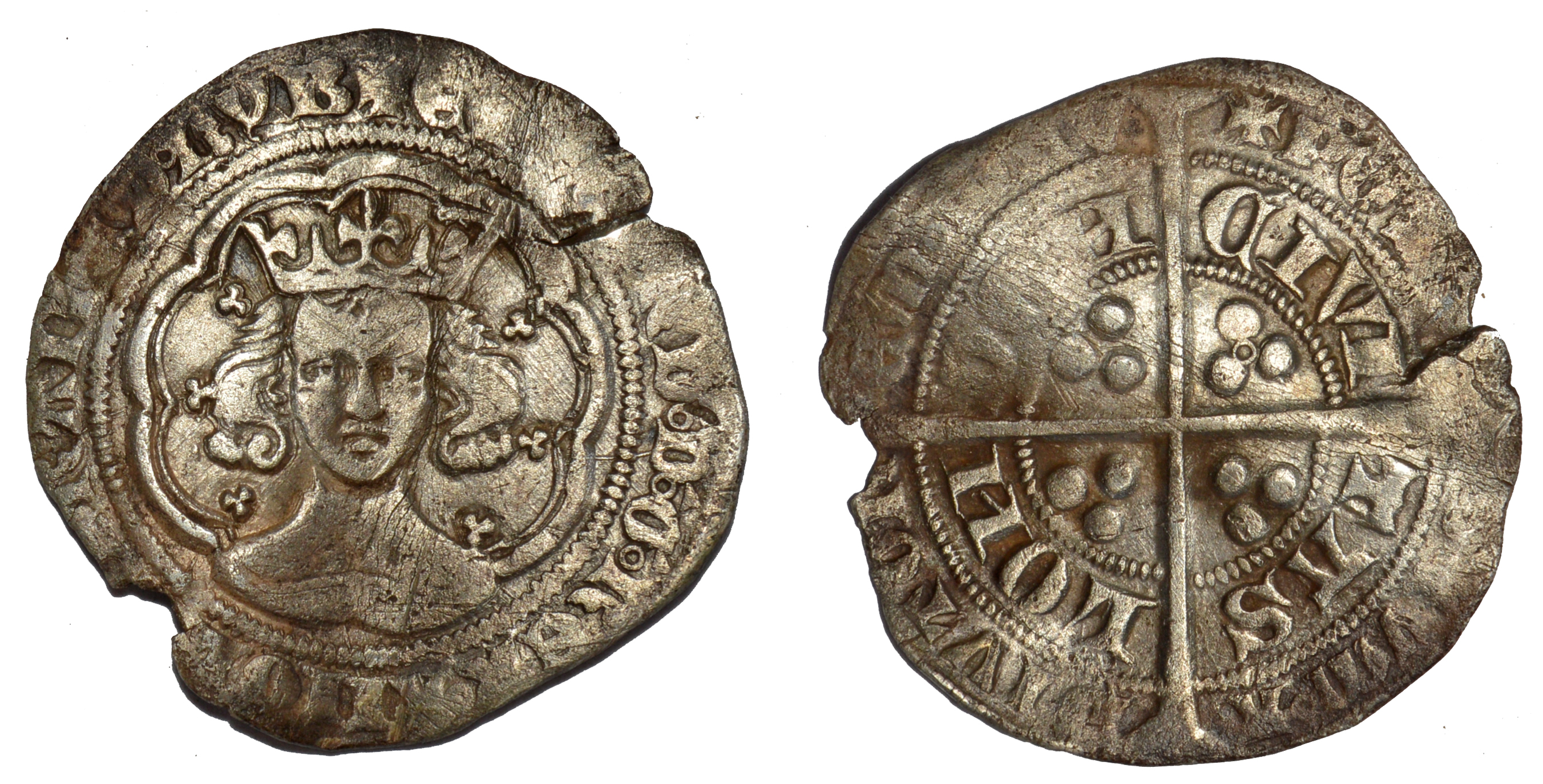
Minted: London, Series: B, Years Minted: 1351–1361 (Courtesy of Guillelmus Thompson, Owner of Coins of Britannia)
Henry VIII: Irish groat
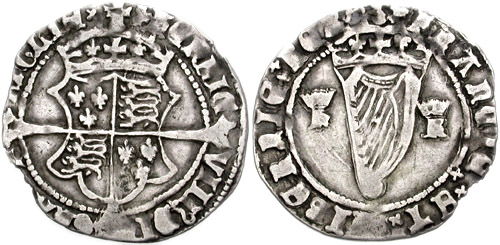
First side of the image: Henry VIII minted these Irish groats, crowned coat-of-arms over cross fourchee; mm: trefoil
Second side of the image: francie et hibernie rex, crowned harp; crowned H and crowned R flanking (Henricus Rex).
AR Groat (25 mm, 2.32 g, 12h). Second harp issue, as king of Ireland, 1541–1542. London mint (exported).
Elizabeth I: Irish groat
First side of the image: elizabeth·d·g·ang·fra·⁊·hib:regin (Elizabeth by the Grace of God, of England, France and Ireland Queen)
Second side of the image: posvi·dev·adivtorem·mev (I have made God my helper)
AR Groat (2.82 g).

It was after the French silver coin had circulated in England that an English groat was first minted under King Edward I.

Scottish groats were not issued until the reign of David II. Scots groats were originally also worth fourpence, but later issues were valued at eightpence and a shilling.

Irish groats were minted first in 1425 and the last ones were minted under the reign of Elizabeth I of England. There were also two more issues, both emergency coinage.

Since the pound sterling or 240 pence was based from the 12th century on a Tower Pound or 5,400 grains (350 g) of sterling or 0.925 fine silver, the English groat or fourpence therefore contained 90 grains (5.8 g) of sterling silver. Later issues became progressively lighter: 72 grains (4.7 g) in 1351 under Edward III, 60 grains (3.9 g) in 1412 under Henry IV, and 48 grains (3.1 g) in 1464 under Edward IV. From 1544 to 1560 (the weight being reduced to 32 grains (2.1 g) in 1559) the silver fineness was less than sterling, and after the 1561 issue they were not generally issued for circulation again for about a hundred years.

From the reigns of Charles II to George III, groats (by now often known as fourpences) were issued on an irregular basis for general circulation, the only years of mintage after 1786 being in 1792, 1795, and 1800. After this the only circulating issues were from 1836 to 1855, with proofs known from 1857 and 1862, and a colonial issue of 1888. These last coins had the weight further reduced to about 27 grains (1.7 g) and were the same diameter as the silver threepenny pieces of the day although thicker. They also had Britannia on the reverse, while all other silver fourpenny pieces since the reign of William and Mary have had a crowned numeral "4" as the reverse, including the silver fourpenny Maundy money coins of the present. Some groats continued to circulate in Scotland until the 20th century.

At times in the past, silver twopenny coins have been called "half-groats".

The groat ceased to be minted in the United Kingdom in 1856, but in 1888 a special request was made for a colonial variety to be minted for use in British Guiana and the British West Indies. The groat remained in circulation in British Guiana right up until that territory adopted the decimal system in 1955.

Groats are still issued in sets of Maundy coinage.

=== Royal Navy chaplains ===
In the 1600s and 1700s, chaplains were employed in English Navy ships of war by the captain, and paid out of a groat per month deducted from the wages of the seamen. The Navy's wages did not rise between 1653 and 1797 (see Spithead and Nore mutinies), during which time the ordinary seaman was paid 19 shillings, as was the chaplain.

== See also ==
- British coinage
- Gros (coinage)
- Groschen
- Kuruş
- Lee Penny (talisman)
- Scottish coinage
- Venetian grosso
