= Kraków grosz =

Medieval Polish coins

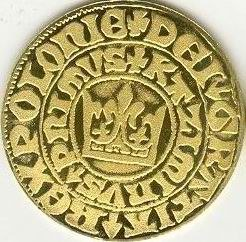
Legend reads: outer ring "DEI GRATIA REX POLONIE"; inner ring "KAZIMIRVS PRIMUS"

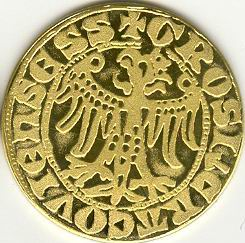
Legend reads: "GROSI CRACOVIENSESS"

The Kraków grosz (Latin: grossus cracoviensis (sing.), grossi cracovienses (pl.), Polish: grosz krakowski, German: Krakauer Groschen) were medieval silver coins minted in 14th century Kraków.

Following the Bohemian Prague groschen in use since 1300, and other large silver groschen-type coins issued in the Holy Roman Empire, the coin was introduced in 1367 during the reign of King Casimir III of Poland.

Its obverse and reverse sides had the following text:

- KAZIMIRVS PRIMUS DEI GRATIA REX POLONIE
- GROSI CRACOVIENSESS (sic!)
