= Ottoman lira =

Currency of the Ottoman Empire 1844–1922

Ottoman pound
ليرا (Ottoman Turkish); livre turque (French)
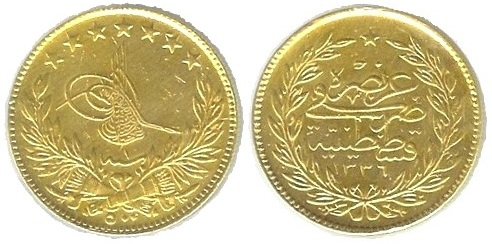
LT 5 (500pt) coin
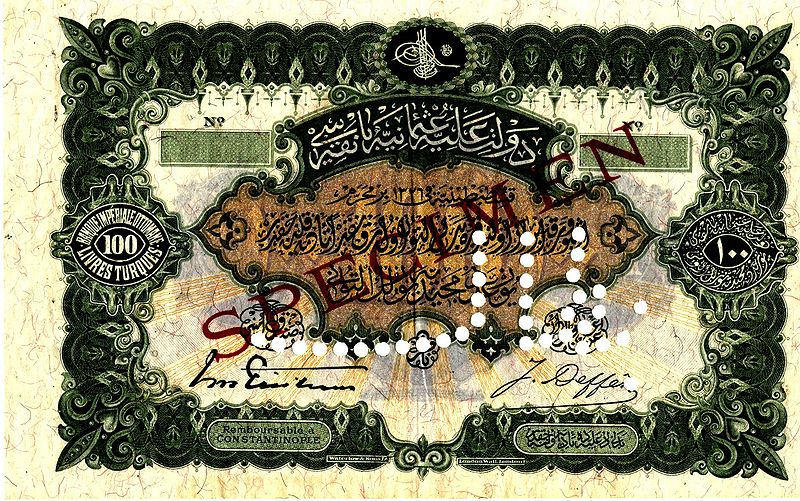
LT 100 banknote

Unit
- Symbol: L.T.

Denominations
- Subunit
- 1/5: mecidiye or medjidiye (colloquially; مجیدیه)
- 1/100: piastre (pt.; قروش)
- 1/4000: para (p; پاره)
- Banknotes: 1pt, 5pt, 10pt, 20pt, 40pt, 50pt, LT 1, LT 2, LT 5, LT 10, LT 25, LT 50, LT 100, LT 500, LT 1,000
- Coins: 1p, 5p, 10p, 20p, 1/2pt, 1pt, 2pt, 5pt, 10pt, 20pt, LT 1/4, LT 1/2, LT 1, LT 2 1/2, LT 5

Demographics
- Official user(s): Ottoman Empire
- Unofficial user: Turkey (until the Turkish lira started circulating)

Issuance
- Central bank: Ottoman Bank
- This infobox shows the latest status before this currency was rendered obsolete.

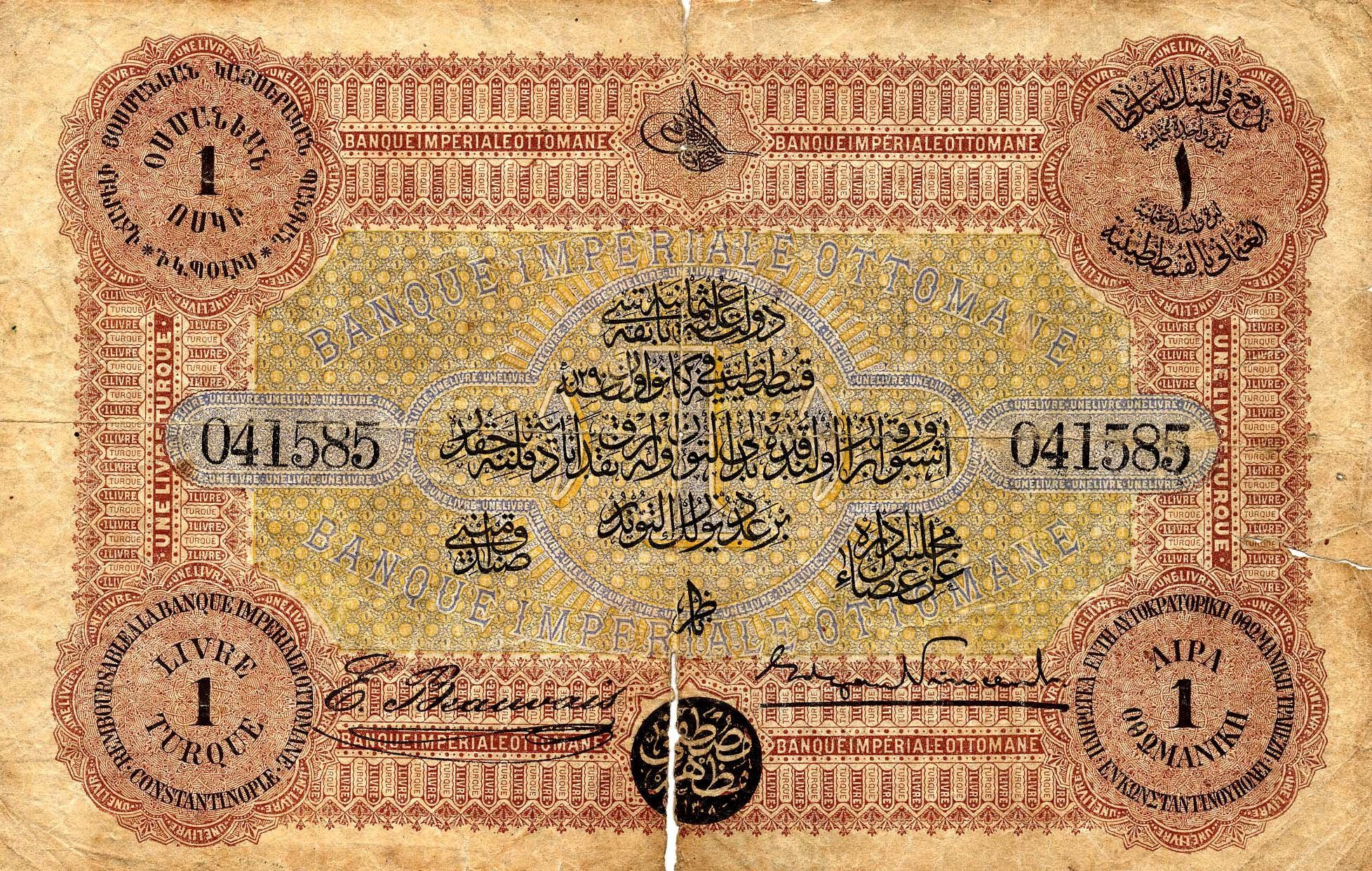
1-lira note dated 1875 but not issued until 1880; it contains text in Persian, Turkish, French, Greek, Armenian and Arabic

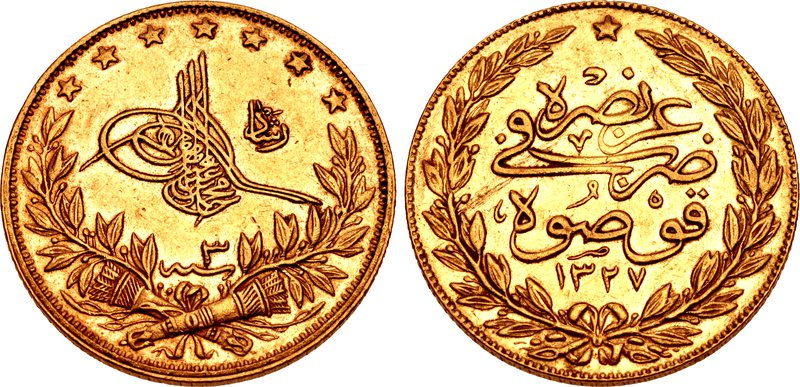
Lira of Mehmed V, 1911

The pound or lira (sign: LT; Ottoman Turkish: ليرا, romanized: līrā; French: livre turque; Greek: οθωμανική λίρα, romanized: othomanikí líra; Armenian: Օսմանյան լիրա, romanized: Osmanyan lira; Arabic: ليرة عثمانية, romanized: līra, lēra ʕuṯmāniyya) was the currency of the Ottoman Empire from 1844 until 1927, when it was replaced by the Turkish lira. Although the Ottoman Empire was abolished in 1922, the Ottoman lira remained in circulation until the end of 1927, as the Republic of Turkey that succeeded it was not in a position to issue its own banknotes yet in its early years.

The Ottoman lira replaced the piastre (Turkish: kuruş) as the principal unit of currency in the Ottoman Empire, with the piastre continuing to circulate as a subdivision of the lira, with 100 piastres = 1 lira. The para also continued to be used, with 40 para = 1 piastre.

Until the 1930s and the Turkish alphabet reform, the Arabic script was used on Turkish coins and banknotes, with پاره for para, قروش for kuruş and ليرا for lira (تورك ليراسي for 'Turkish lira'). In European languages, the kuruş was known as the piastre, whilst the lira was known as the livre in French and the pound in English. English-language publications used "£T" as the sign for the currency, but it is unknown whether it was ever used natively.

Between 1844 and 1881, the lira was on a bimetallic standard, with LT 1 = 6.61519 grams pure gold (roughly 9/10 of a British Sovereign) = 99.8292 grams pure silver. In 1881, the gold standard was adopted and continued until 1914. World War I saw Turkey effectively depart from the gold standard with the gold lira being worth about LT 9 in paper money by the early 1920s.

Between 1844 and 1855, coins were introduced in denominations of 1p, 5p, 10p, 20p, 1/2pt, 1pt, 2pt, 5pt, 10pt, 20pt and LT 1/4, LT 1/2, LT 1, LT 2 1/2 and LT 5. The para denominations were struck in copper, the kuruş in silver and the lira in gold. The 1p was discontinued in 1859, with the higher copper denominations ceasing production between 1863 and 1879. In 1899, billon 5p and 10p were introduced, followed by nickel 5p, 10p, 20p and 40p in 1910. Gold coins continued to be minted after the abolition of the gold standard, even into the 1920s, but their value far exceeded the value of the equivalent denominations in paper currency.

The central Ottoman Bank first issued paper currency known as kaime in 1862, in the denomination of 200pt. The notes bore texts in Turkish and French. Notes for LT 1, LT 2 and LT 5 were introduced in 1873. In 1876, smaller denomination notes were introduced for 1pt, 5pt, 10pt, 20pt, 50pt and 100pt. In 1908, LT 50 and LT 100 notes were introduced.

From 1912, the Ministry of Finance issued paper money. Initially, notes were produced in denominations of 5pt and 20pt, LT 1/4, LT 1/2, LT 1 and LT 5, followed the next year by 1pt and 2 1/2pt, LT 2 1/2, LT 10, LT 25, LT 50, LT 100 and LT 500. LT 1,000 notes were introduced in 1914. In 1917, postage stamp money was issued in the form of 5p and 10p stamps affixed to card.
