= Hexagram (currency) =

Coin from Byzantine empire

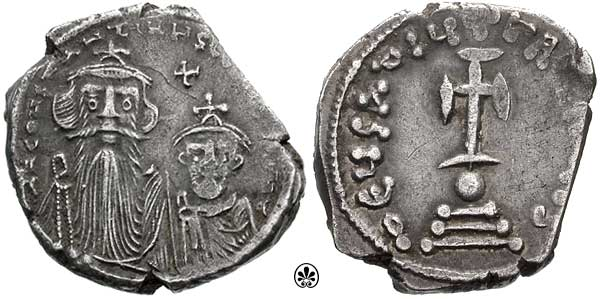
Hexagram of Constans II and Constantine IV.

The hexagram (Greek: ἑξάγραμμα, hexagramma) was a large silver coin of the Byzantine Empire issued primarily during the 7th century AD.

With the exception of a few 6th-century ceremonial issues, silver coins were not used in the late Roman/early Byzantine monetary system (see Byzantine coinage), chiefly because of the great fluctuation of its price relative to gold. Only under Emperor Heraclius (r. 610–641), in 615, were new silver coins minted to cover the needs of the war with Sassanid Persia. The material for these coins came chiefly from the confiscation of church plate. They were named after their weight of six grammata (6.84 grams), and probably valued at 12 to the gold solidus. The Hexagrams uniquely carried the inscription of Deus adiuta Romanis or "May God help the Romans"; It is believed that this shows the desperation of the empire at this time.

The coin remained in regular issue under Heraclius's successor Constans II (r. 641–668), from whose reign many specimens survive, but becomes rarer for Constantine IV (r. 668–685), and thereafter seems to have been only occasionally minted as a ceremonial coin until Theodosius III (r. 715–717). In 720 Emperor Leo III the Isaurian (r. 717–741) issued a new silver coin, the miliaresion.

== Sources ==
- Grierson, Philip (1999). Byzantine Coinage (PDF). Washington, District of Columbia: Dumbarton Oaks. ISBN 978-0-88402-274-9. Archived from the original (PDF) on 2010-06-13.
- Kaegi, W.E.J. (2003). Heraclius, Emperor of Byzantium. Cambridge University Press. ISBN 978-0-521-81459-1.
- Kazhdan, Alexander Petrovich, ed. (1991). The Oxford Dictionary of Byzantium. New York, New York and Oxford, United Kingdom: Oxford University Press. ISBN 978-0-19-504652-6.
