= Groschen =

Name of various coins, often in Central Europe

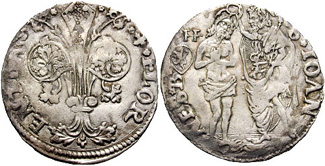
Barile (large groschen), Florence, 1506

Groschen (German: [ˈɡʁɔʃn̩]; from Latin: grossus "thick", via Old Czech groš) is the (sometimes colloquial) name for various coins, especially a silver coin used in parts of Europe, including some of the Italian states, and various states of the Holy Roman Empire.

The word is borrowed from the late Latin grossus denarius Turnosus, 'thick denarius of Tours', a description of a tornese. Groschen was frequently abbreviated in old documents to gl, in which the second character was not an L (12th letter of the alphabet), but an abbreviation symbol; later it was written as Gr or g.

== Names and etymology ==
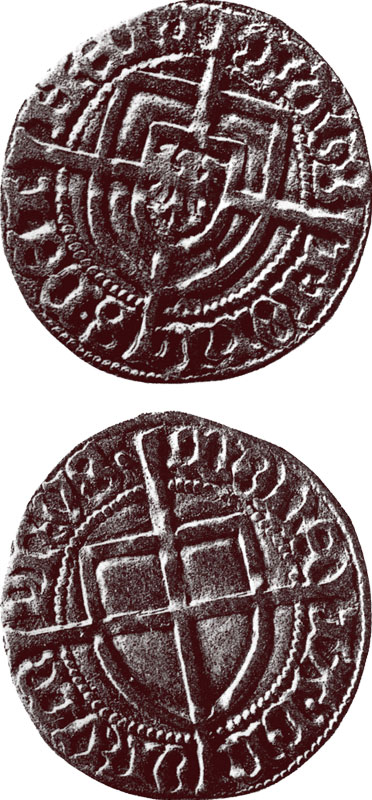
Teutonic Order groschen of the 14th century

The name was introduced in 13th-century France as [denarius] grossus, lit. "thick penny", whence Old French gros, Italian grosso, Middle High German gros(se), Low German and Dutch grōte and English groat. In the 14th century, it appeared as Old Czech groš, whence Modern German Groschen.

Names in other modern languages include:

- Albanian: grosh
- Amharic: gersh
- Arabic: قرش, romanized: qirsh
- Bulgarian, Macedonian, Russian, Belarusian, Ukrainian: грош
- Czech, Slovak, Serbo-Croatian: groš
- Dutch: groot
- Estonian: kross
- French: gros
- Greek: γρόσι, romanized: grósi
- Hebrew: grush
- Hungarian: garas
- Latvian: grasis
- Lithuanian: grašis
- Polish: grosz
- Romanian: groș
- Yiddish: גראָשן, romanized: groshn
- Turkish: kuruş

The Arabic, Amharic, Hebrew, Greek and Turkish names for currency denominations in and around the territories formerly part of the Ottoman Empire derived from the same origin "Groschen", since it was the common name for all the silver coins throughout the early modern Europe.

== History ==
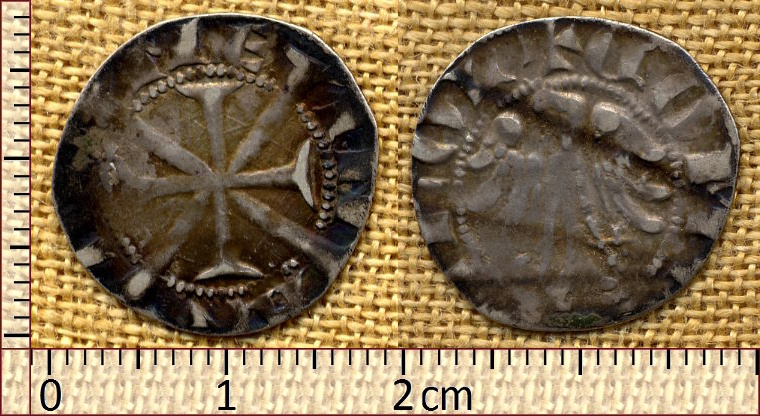
Tyrolean groschen of 1286

=== Middle Ages ===
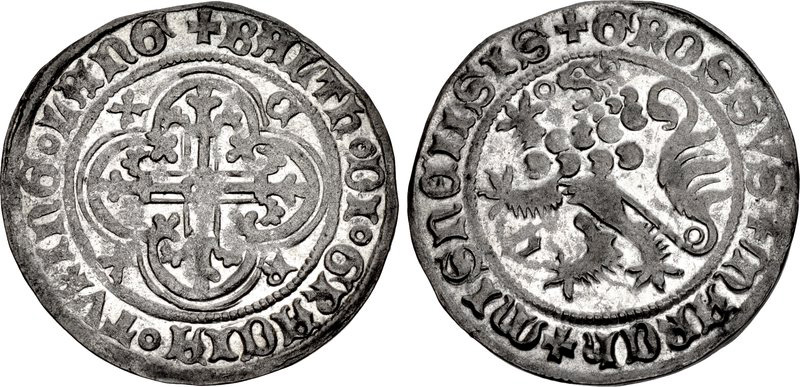
A Fürstengroschen of Landgrave Balthasar of Thuringia from the Freiberg Mint, 1405–1406

Names like groschen, grossus/grossi, grosso, grossone, grosz, gros, groš, groat, Groten, garas etc. were used in the Middle Ages for all thick silver coins, as opposed to thin silver coins such as deniers or pennies. Historically it was equal to between several and a dozen denarii.

In the German-speaking world, the groschen was usually worth 12 pfennigs; many regional (small) groschen such as Neugroschen, Groten (plural: Grote) in northern Germany, English: groat, Mariengroschen, Grösch(e)l were worth between 2 1/2 and 10 pfennigs. The later Kreuzer, a coin worth 4 pfennigs arose from the linguistic abbreviation of the small Kreuzgroschen.

The groschen was first introduced into the Holy Roman Empire in 1271 by Duke Meinhard II of Tyrol in Merano after the Republic of Venice struck its first 2.1-grain silver grosso in 1192. It was originally a solid coin of pure silver, larger than the denarius which was no longer valid. In essence, it took the place of a variety of the older pfennigs, whose silver purity had inflated their value over the centuries. According to one source, the city of Trier is said to have struck groschen-like, thick pfennigs as early as 1104, which were then followed in 1300 by the Bohemian groschen from Kuttenberg. The new coin soon inspired other 'mint lords' (Münzherren) and was given, not least for reasons of economic necessity, a higher face value in the Early Renaissance period. Upper Italian coins of multiple pfennig value in the High Middle Ages were similarly called Grossini (cf. also Schilling).

The 1286 Tyrolean example (above right) weighs 1.45 grams (22.4 grains), it is marked with me in ar dvs (for "Meinhard") and a Double Cross (obverse), and with dvx tirol and the Eagle of Tyrol (reverse).

In 1328 Emperor Louis IV, the Bavarian, authorised Count Adolf VI of Berg to mint torneses in Wipperfürth. The oldest groschen in the area that is now modern Germany were minted there until 1346.

Following the example of the Tours Grossus, the Prague groschen or groš was minted in Kuttenberg and, around 1338–1339, the Meissen groschen in Freiberg's National Mint in the Margraviate of Meissen. Both coins gained importance throughout the empire and had a strong influence on German coinage. Groschen valued at 12 pfennigs were common. The Polish groschen or grosz was worth only half as much – 6 pfennigs – and was commonly used in Silesia as a grosch(e)l or gresch(e)l worth just 2 1/2 to 3 pfennigs.

The 'prince's groschen' (Fürstengroschen) set a record in terms of the devaluation of the Meissen groschen. When this groschen was introduced in March 1393, its value was 23 2/5 of a Rhenish guilder. In 1406, the devaluation of these coins reached its peak: 53 groschen were now equal to 1 Rhenish guilder.

The groschen was minted during the Middle Ages in the following areas:

- Venice (from 1193)
- Tirol (from 1271)
- England (from 1279, the groat)
- Bohemia (from 1300, the Prague groschen, later adopted by most of the Central European countries)
- Poland (from 1367, the Cracow grosz, 3.2 grams (49 grains) of silver, an equivalent of 12 denarii)
- Moldavia (from the reign of Petru I, 1375–1391)
- The type was also minted during various times in the Duchy of Luxembourg, such as the 22-millimetre 1/2 gros produced from 1418 to 1425 under John III the Pitiless, Duke of Bavaria, bearing slightly varying inscriptions of ioah dvx bavar ⁊ filivs on the obverse, and mone nova lvce bvrs on the reverse.

=== Early modern period ===
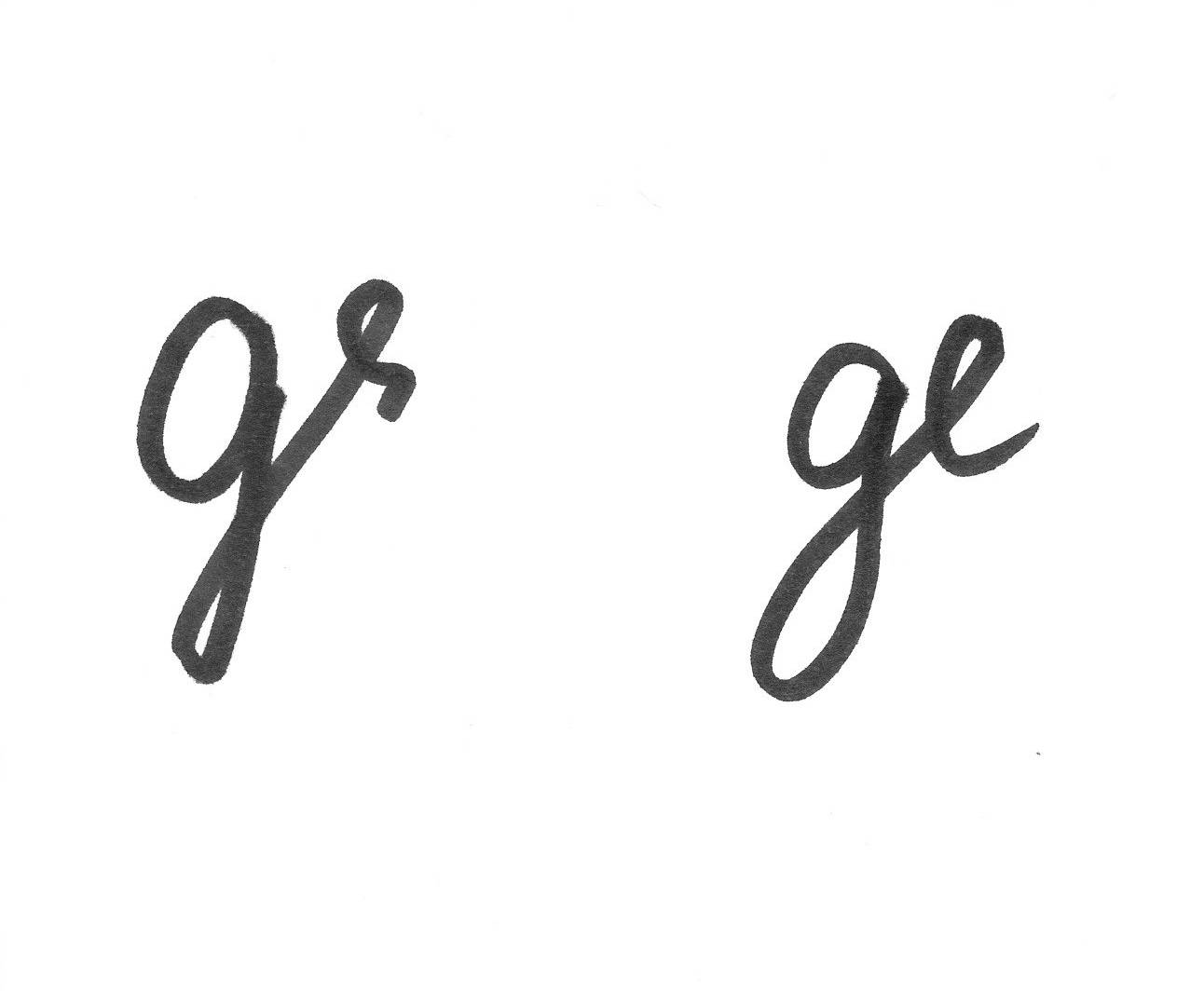
Abbreviations for groschen or groten in 19th century literature

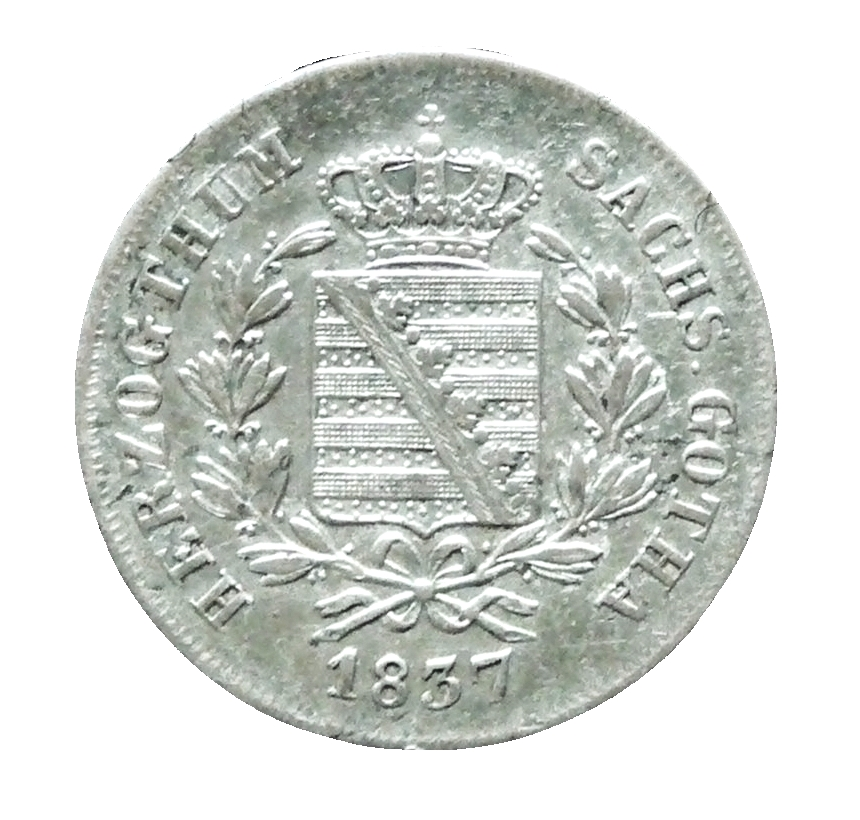
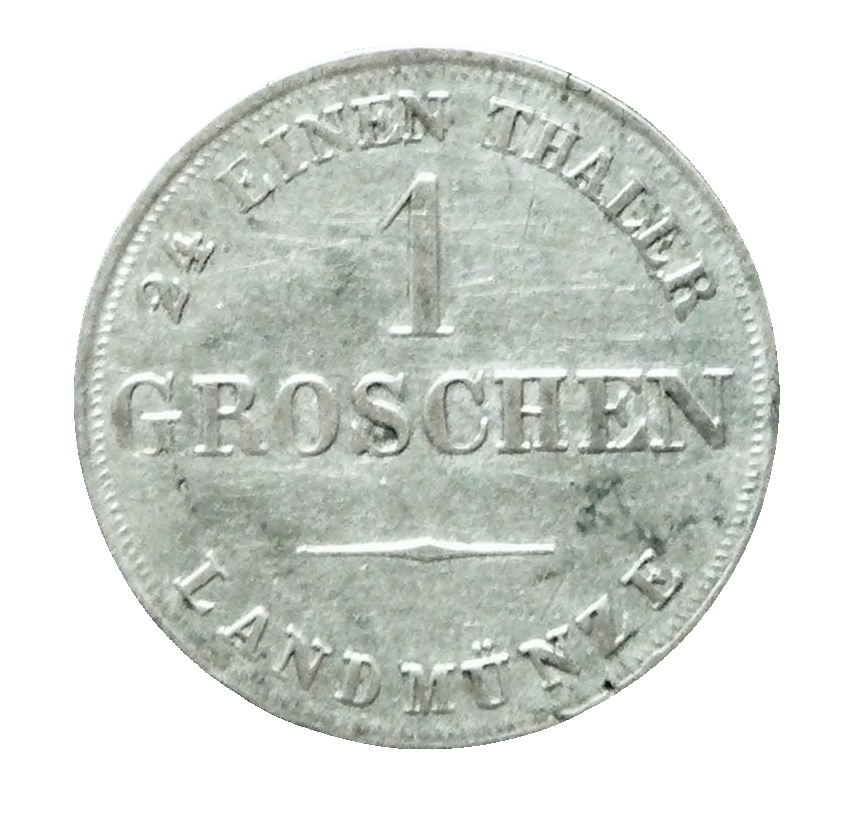
Last convention groschen for the Duchy of Gotha, 1837, Gotha Mint
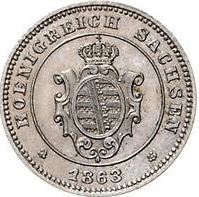
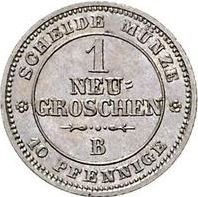
An 1863 Neugroschen, worth 10 pfennigs, 30 made a thaler (diameter = 18 mm, Dresden Mint)

Later the tradition of Groschen was dropped in most states while others continued to mint only coins smaller than the original coin. In Poland for example, from 1526 these included coins of 1/2 grosz, 1 grosz, 1 1/2 grosz, 2 grosz, 3 grosz, 4 grosz and 6 grosz. Their weight steadily dropped to 1.8 grams (28 grains) of silver and since 1752 they were replaced by copper coins of the same name.

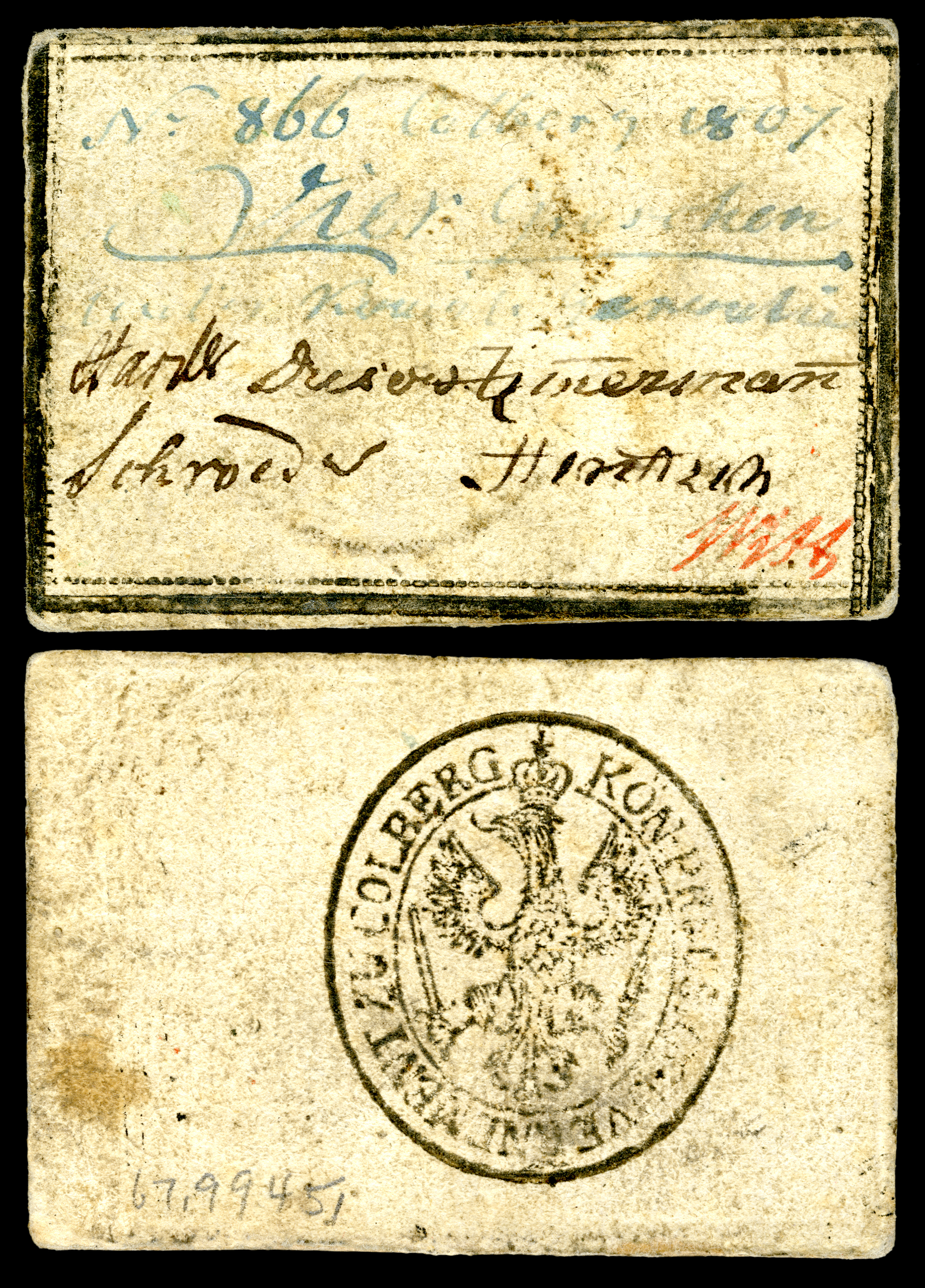
Emergency issue currency for the Siege of Kolberg (1807), 4 groschen

In Germany, the name Groschen (both singular and plural) replaced Schilling as the common name for a 12-pfennig coin. In the 18th century it was used predominantly in the northern states as a coin worth 1/24 of a Reichsthaler (equal to 1/32 of a Conventionsthaler). In the 19th century, a new currency system was introduced in which the Groschen, often under a new name to distinguish it from the old, was worth 1/30 of a Thaler or Taler. This began in 1821 in Prussia, where the coin was called the Silbergroschen (Sgr) and was worth 12 pfennigs. Saxony followed in 1840 with the Neugroschen (ngr), also 1/30 of a thaler, but subdivided in 10 (new) pfennigs. Silesia and Bohemia introduced the white groschen (Weissgroschen) in 1821 at the same time as Prussia. Frederick William III of Prussia could not yet decide on the consistent introduction of the decimal system. In order to be able to distinguish his new pfennig' from the old ones, they were called Pfenninge.

The last German Kurantgroschen with a face value equalling the silver content value were issued in the Kingdom of Saxony in 1827 and 1828, and in the Duchy of Saxe-Coburg and Gotha in 1837. These were based on a monetary standard, the Konventionsfuß, of the state, according to which the silver contained in 320 groschen was equal to the weight of a Cologne Mark (233.856 grammes).

An exception in relation to the value of thaler coins is the series of 'butterfly coins' (Schmetterlingsmünzen) in the Electorate of Saxony. All these coins only show their value in groschen; the usual abbreviation for groschen used in the everyday correspondence being used for the denomination on the coins. Likewise, the abbreviation for groschen used in the written word was stamped on the Electoral Saxon golden Reichsgulden zu 21 Groschen of 1584. In this case, it was probably intended to express the fact that it is a coin of account (Rechnungsmünze). Another special case is the Kipperthaler, on which the value in groschen (or Kreuzer) is also stamped to circumvent the Imperial Minting Ordinance (Reichsmünzordnung). Also interesting are thalers, which were minted in denominations of 28 and 24 groschen without differences in design and size. For example, the 24 groschen Hosenbandtaler were also coins of account, which is sometimes not recognized.

Following German unification and decimalisation, with 100 pfennigs to the mark, the groschen was replaced by the 10-pfennig coin and groschen remained a nickname for the 10-pfennig coin until the introduction of the euro. For the same reason, the name Sechser (sixer) remained in use regionally for the half-groschen coin, 5 Pfennigs.

There is a Beethoven rondo for piano, opus 129 (1795) entitled "Die Wut über den verlorenen Groschen" (literally "The Rage Over the Lost Groschen", but known in English as "Rage Over a Lost Penny"). Also Die Dreigroschenoper, Kurt Weil, Bertold Brecht

== Modern currencies ==
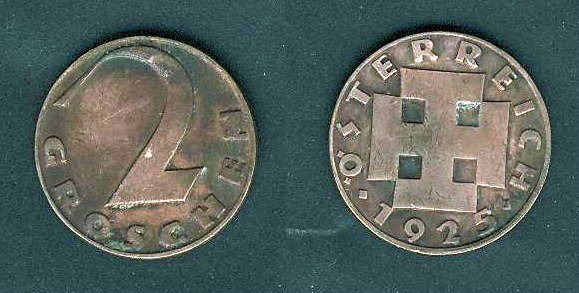
Austrian 2 Groschen coin, 1925

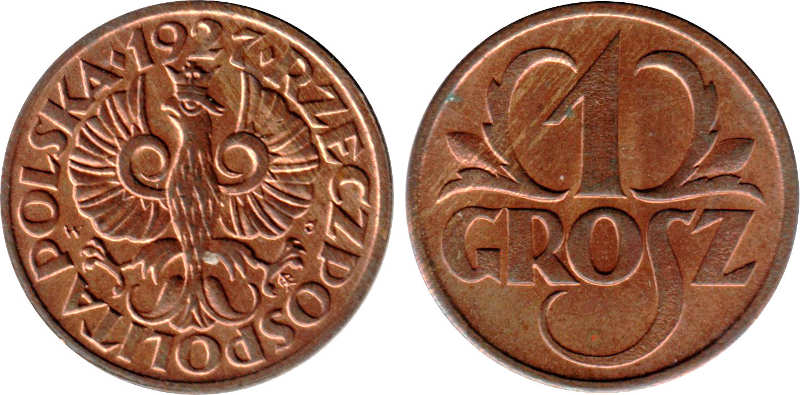
1 grosz coin, Second Polish Republic, 1927

In recent times, the name was used by three currencies in circulation:

- In Poland, a grosz (plural: grosze or groszy, depending on the number) is a 1/100 part of a złoty
- In Austria, a Groschen (plural: Groschen) was a 1/100 part of a Schilling from 1924 to 1938 and again from 1945 to 2001, with an interruption following Austria's incorporation into Nazi Germany in 1938 (the Anschluss)
- In Turkey, a kuruş is a 1/100 part of the lira.

Likewise, in Germany groschen remained a slang term for the 10 pfennig coin, thus a 1/10 part both of the (West German) Deutsche Mark and the East German mark. The word has lost popularity with the introduction of the euro, although it can still be heard on occasion, especially from older people.

The Ukrainian and Belarusian common word for money, hroshi, derives from the word "grosh".

In Bulgaria, the grosh (Cyrillic: грош) was used as a currency until the lev was introduced in the 19th century.

In Palestine during the British Mandate, a grush was a coin with a hole in it, valued at 1/100 part of a pound (ten mils). It was named after an Ottoman coin. When the pound was replaced by the lira after Israeli statehood in 1948, the name was transferred to a coin (no longer with a hole) worth 1/100 of a lira (ten perutot, later one agora). The name persisted for a while after the lira was replaced by the shekel in 1980 (one new agora, worth ten old agorot), but it gradually lost its standing as the name of a certain coin. Now it is slang for a very small value.

Austria introduced the groschen in 1924 as the subdivision of the schilling. It was restored, along with the schilling, in 1945 and continued in use until the introduction of the euro in 2002.

== See also ==
- Kuruş
- Gros (coinage)
- Groat (coin)
- Venetian grosso
- Coinage of Saxony
- The Threepenny Opera
