= Neugroschen =

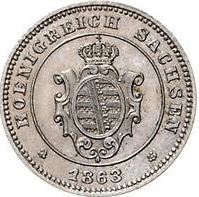
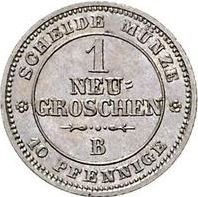
1863 Neugroschen, divided into 10 Pfennigs, 30 to a Thaler (diameter 18 mm, Dresden Mint)

The Neugroschen ("new groschen", abbreviation Ngr.) was a Saxon Scheidemünze coin minted from 1841 to 1873 which had the inscription Neugroschen. This groschen, made of billon, was equivalent to the Prussian groschen but, unlike the latter, was divided not into 12, but into 10 pfennigs.

== History ==
In 1838, the Kingdom of Saxony joined the Dresden Coinage Convention and minted 233.855 g of silver from the fine mark to the Prussian Graumann mint standard as follows: the 14 Thaler standard:

- 7 Double Thaler = 14 Thaler
  - 1 Thaler = 30 neugroschen = 300 pfennigs
  - 1 Neugroschen = 10 Pfennig

From 1857 to 1873 they were minted to the 30 Thaler standard. The basic coin weight was the Zollpfund ("customs pound") at 500 g:

- 1 pound of fine silver = 30 Vereinsthaler
  - 1 Vereinsthaler = 30 neugroschen = 300 pfennigs

Neugroschen and pfennigs were fractional coins.

== Literature ==
- Paul Arnold, Harald Küthmann, Dirk Steinhilber: Großer deutscher Münzkatalog von 1800 bis heute, Augsburg 1997.
- Max Barduleck: Die letzten Jahre der Münze in Dresden. Werksverzeichnis 1865 bis 1911, published by Paul Arnold, Berlin 1981.
- Heinz Fengler, Gerd Gierow, Willy Unger: transpress Lexikon Numismatik, Berlin 1976.
- Walther Haupt: Sächsische Münzkunde, Deutscher Verlag der Wissenschaft, Berlin 1974.
- Helmut Kahnt: Das große Münzlexikon von A bis Z, Regenstauf 2005.
- Friedrich von Schrötter (ed.) mit N. Bauer, K. Regling, A. Suhle, R. Vasmer, J. Wilcke: Wörterbuch der Münzkunde, de Gruyter, Berlin 1970 (reprint of the original 1930 edn.).
