= Byzantine economy =

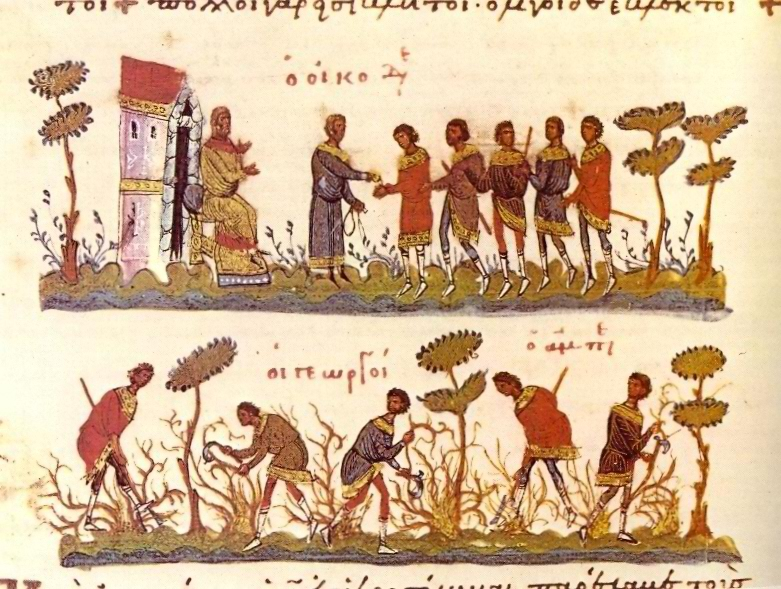
Parable of the Workers in the Vineyard. Workers on the field (down) and pay time (up), Byzantine Gospel of 11th century.

The Byzantine economy was among the most robust economies in the Mediterranean and the world for many centuries. Constantinople was a prime hub in a trading network that at various times extended across nearly all of Eurasia and North Africa. It could be argued that up until the 7th century, the Eastern Roman Empire had the most powerful economy in the world. (Note: In that period, China was fragmented into multiple states while the Gupta Empire was in decline. On the other hand, following the collapse of the Western Roman Empire, the Eastern Roman Empire's economy flourished with strong trade networks and massive state revenues that enabled the construction of magnificent structures as well as the funding of expensive wars. However, with the establishment of the Sui Dynasty in 581, the Sui Dynasty could contest the title of having the most powerful economy in the world, although it also faced financial difficulties following their failed campaigns against Goguryeo Korea.) The Arab conquests, however, would represent a substantial reversal of fortunes contributing to a period of decline and stagnation. The Byzantine state restructured its administrative and fiscal systems, introducing the theme system, which organized land and military service in a way that ensured both local defense and agricultural productivity.

Trade routes of the Eastern Roman Empire.

Rural life revived as new lands were brought under cultivation, and local economies became more self-sufficient, reducing dependence on long-distance trade that had been curtailed by the loss of eastern territories. By the 9th and 10th centuries, the empire experienced a notable resurgence: agricultural output increased, population levels rose, and the circulation of coinage expanded once again. However, by the 12th and 13th centuries, the economic balance began to shift. Western maritime republics such as Venice and Genoa gradually overtook Byzantine merchants, largely due to the tax exemptions and trading privileges granted to them under the Komnenian emperors. This process accelerated after the Fourth Crusade and the establishment of the Latin Empire, during which Venetian traders gained control over key ports and commercial networks once held by the Byzantines. The Byzantines continued to face economic challenges during the Palaiologan era until its fall in 1453.

One of the economic foundations of the empire was trade. The state strictly controlled both the internal and the international trade. It has been argued by the historian Alex M. Feldman that this amounted to an early version of the political economy of mercantilism. Constantinople remained the single most important commercial centre of Europe for much of the Medieval era, which it held until the Republic of Venice slowly began to overtake Byzantine merchants in trade; first through tax exemption under the Komnenoi, then under the Latin Empire.

== Agriculture ==
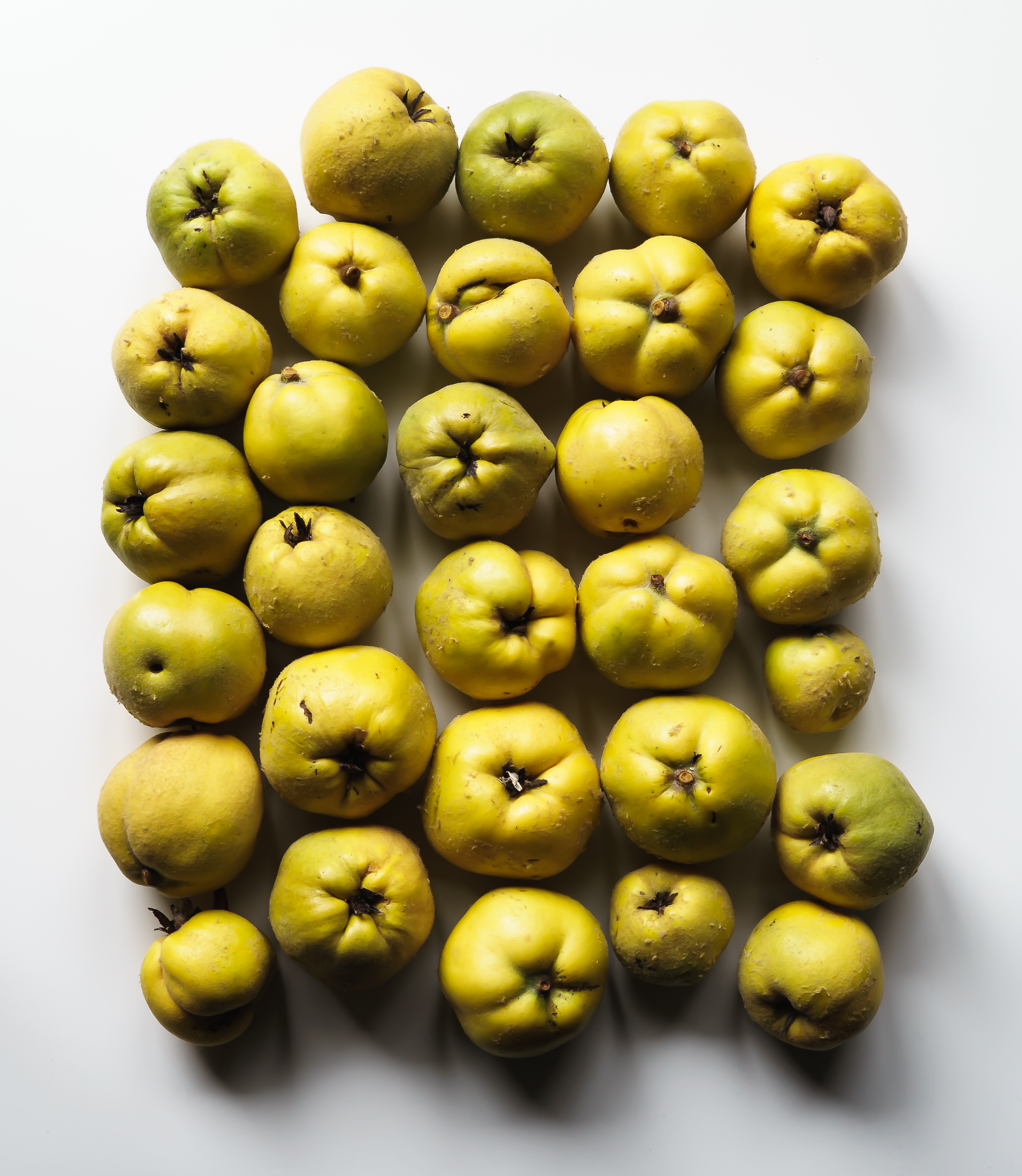
Constantinople apple quinces

From 4th to end of 6th century the eastern part of Roman Empire had demographic, economic and agricultural expansion. The climate was opportune for farming. Even in marginal regions rural settlements flourished. The Arab conquests of the 7th century and subsequent territorial losses disrupted traditional agricultural regions, particularly in Egypt and the Levant, leading to a decline in surplus production and forcing the empire to rely more on Anatolia and the Balkans. During the middle Byzantine period, agricultural recovery occurred alongside political stabilization. Reforms encouraged small-scale farming, irrigation, and improved crop techniques. Large estates still existed, but many peasants gained more autonomy, and the production of olive oil, wine, and cereals expanded to meet both domestic and trade demands.

The 12th century saw the development of tilling and milling technologies in the West, but there is less evidence for similar Byzantine innovation. Western advances like the windmill were adopted by the Byzantines, but, unlike the West, Arabic numerals were not yet implemented for double-entry book-keeping. There are illustrations of agricultural implements from illuminated medieval manuscripts of Hesiod's Works and Days including the wheel, mortar, pestle, mallet and some parts for carts and soleard plough, but, even centuries later, neither the plough nor wheeled cart were widely in use, possibly because of the nature of the Pontic terrain.

In the late Byzantine period (13th–15th centuries), after the Latin occupation and territorial fragmentation, agriculture faced new challenges. Estates were often overtaxed, and warfare or raids disrupted rural life. Despite this, certain regions, particularly in western Anatolia and parts of Greece, remained productive, supplying local markets and urban centers. Throughout Byzantine history, agriculture remained the foundation of the empire’s economy, adapting to political and environmental pressures while sustaining urban populations, the military, and long-distance trade.

== Economic and fiscal history ==
Pre-518: Constantinian, Theodosian, and Leonid dynasties

The Eastern Roman economy suffered less from the Barbarian raids that plagued the Western Roman Empire. Under Diocletian's reign, the Eastern Roman Empire's annual revenue was at 9,400,000 solidi, out of a total of 18,000,000 solidi for the entire Roman Empire. These estimates can be compared to the AD 150 annual revenue of 14,500,000 solidi and the AD 215 of 22,000,000 solidi. By the end of Marcian's reign, the annual revenue for the Eastern empire was 7,800,000 solidi, thus allowing him to amass about 100,000 pounds/45 tonnes of gold or 7,200,000 solidi for the imperial treasury. Warren Treadgold estimates that during the period from Diocletian to Marcian, the Eastern Empire's population and agriculture declined a little, but not much. In fact, the few preserved figures show that the largest eastern cities grew somewhat between the 3rd and 5th centuries. By Marcian's reign the Eastern Empire's difficulties seem to have been easing, and the population had probably begun growing for the first time in centuries.

518-602: Justinian dynasty

The period encompassing Anastasius' and the first half of Justinian's reign saw further economic expansion, with state revenues increasing and a decline in land abandonment and complaints of overtaxation. Such growth would also explain the other signs of public and private prosperity at the time, including Justinian's ability to undertake so many costly activities at once.

By the end of his reign, Anastasius I had managed to collect for the treasury an amount of 23,000,000 solidi or 320,000 pounds/103.5 tonnes of gold, and at the start of Justinian I's reign, the Emperor had inherited a surplus 28,800,000 from Anastasius I and Justin I. The wealth of Constantinople can be seen by how Justin I used 3,700 pounds/1.66 tonnes of gold just for celebrating his own consulship. Due to the empire's affluence, Justinian was able to undertake costly building projects and wars. The church of the Holy Apostles in Constantinople and the church of Saint John at Ephesus likely cost 1 million solidi each, and the Perpetual Peace with Persia cost 792,000 solidi. Justinian's conquest of North Africa had cost the empire 8 million solidi (36 tons of gold), while the conquest of Italy had required 21.5 million solidi (96.75 tons of gold). The total expenditure of the empire on wars during Justinian's reign amounted to 35.765 million solidi (161 tons of gold). According to Warren Treadgold, the capture of the Vandal and Ostrogothic treasures had likely covered much of the expenses of Justinian's campaigns in North Africa and Italy. Before Justinian I's reconquests the state had an annual revenue of 5,000,000 solidi, which further increased after his reconquests in 550. At the height of Justinian's reign in 540 (before the plague), the annual state revenues of the Byzantine Empire were estimated to be as high as 11.3 million (50.85 tons of gold) solidi.

Nevertheless, Justinian I had little money left towards the end of his reign partly because of the Justinian Plague, and the Roman–Persian Wars (Justinian had spent large amounts of money in annual subsidies to the Sassanian Empire), as well as his wars of reconquest in Italy and North Africa, all of which greatly strained the royal treasury. In addition to these expenses, the rebuilding of Hagia Sophia cost 20,000 pounds/ 9 tonnes of gold. Upon Justin II's ascension to the throne, he ceased the payment of subsidies to the Avars and undertook measures to garner public support, as well as to stabilise the treasury. He gave out large donatives, immediately repaid loans that Justinian had forced the wealthy to make to the government, and cancelled all tax arrears up to 560. In 569, Justin II introduced new taxes on bread and wine. Justin II's fiscal policies thus enabled him to leave a surplus in the treasury for his successor. However, historian Edward J. Watts has criticised Justin II for overstating the extent of the empire's financial woes post-Justinian in his propaganda, as the treasury he had inherited from Justinian possessed sufficient funds to pay off loans immediately. On the other hand, in using early debt repayments as propaganda to convince the public that the bankers' power was broken (and that Justin II championed regular Constantinopolitans over the bankers), the steady interest payments the financial elite relied on were cut off, eroding their trust in the government and making future fundraising more difficult.

Tiberius II, who succeeded Justin II, was more extravagant in his spending. During his term as Caesar, he gave lavish donatives and abolished Justin's taxes on bread and wine, and his expenditure was large enough for Justin II and Sophia to impose a ceiling for his expenditure and restrict his access to the treasury. Following Justin II's death and Tiberius II's assumption of the throne, he gave away 7,200 pounds of gold each year for four years, on top of giving away the treasure of Narses and 1,000 centenaria to the poor (allegedly worth 100,000 pounds of gold). In 579, he sent more money and reinforcements to Italy as well.

By the time Maurice ascended the throne in 582, Tiberius II had spent virtually all of Justin II's accumulated reserves, and Maurice was forced to be thriftier. Maurice attempted to economise on army pay multiple times, and in 602 his last attempt to economise led to a mutiny that culminated in the deposition of Maurice and the elevation of Phocas to the throne. Subsidies to enemy states were also paid by Justinian's successors: Justin II was forced to pay 80,000 silver coins to the Avars for peace; his wife Sophia paid 45,000 solidi to Khosrau I in return for a year's truce. The East Roman Empire's aristocratic language of Latin began to erode and give way to the native language of Greek starting during the Roman-Persian Great War of 602-628, the solidus (plural: solidi) would begin to also be known by its Greek name, the nomisma (plural: nomismata). For all of the financial difficulties the empire faced, the government kept its revenues at a remarkably high level under the circumstances and was able to pay its soldiers. The government would have been functioning at a high level of efficiency to handle its fiscal problems well and avoid financial collapse and bankruptcy.

610-1056: Heraclian, Isaurian, Amorian, Macedonian Dynasties

However, after the deposition of Maurice and the ascension of Phocas to the throne, the empire's financial situation worsened. During the final Byzantine Sassanid War, Egypt, Syria and Byzantine Mesopotamia were lost to the Persians, and these territories must have made up more than half of the empire's total revenues. Heraclius was able to avert bankruptcy through unprecedented borrowing from the church, substantially reducing state salaries and melting down statues in order to pay the empire's soldiers. Although Heraclius regained those territories following his victory in the war, the Arabs would conquer those territories a few years later.

The Byzantine-Arab Wars reduced the territory of the Empire to a third in the 7th century and the economy slumped; in 780 the Byzantine Empire's revenues were reduced to only 1,800,000 nomismata. The main reason for such a drastic decline in revenues was due to the conquest of Syria, Egypt and Africa by the Arab invaders. Additionally, most cities shrank, and the trade volume declined greatly. The revenues of the empire in the year 641 dropped to 3.7 million nomisma, and dropped further to 2 million nomisma during Constans II's reign. It was only from the 8th century onward the Empire's economy improved dramatically. This was a blessing for Byzantium in more than one way; the economy, the administration of gold coinage and the farming of the Anatolian peninsula served to meet the military's constant demands. Since Byzantium was in a constant state of warfare with her neighbours (even if only by raiding) the military required weapons to be manufactured by the bigger cities (such as Thessaloniki) whilst the smaller towns were subject to grain, wine and even biscuit requisitions by Imperial officers. Even though the soldiers' pay was minimal, large armies were a considerable strain on Byzantium. But soldiers were paid to serve in the army; they would in time spend the money acquiring their own goods. As a result, the Byzantine economy was self-sufficient, allowing it to thrive in the Dark Ages. The success of the Byzantine army was in no small part due to the success of her economy.

Around 775, the land and head taxes yielded an estimated 1,600,000 nomismata/7.2 tonnes of gold annually for the empire. Commerce during this period slumped, therefore only contributing 200,000 nomismata annually. The expenditures of the period were quite large when compared to the annual revenues. Approximately 600,000 nomismata went to the payroll of the army annually while other military costs took another 600,000 nomismata annually. Supporting the Byzantine bureaucracy needed 400,000 nomismata. Also, imperial largess cost the treasury 100,000 nomismata every year. All of these expenses meant that the Byzantine government had only about 100,000 nomismata in surplus revenue each year for treaties, bribes, or gifts.

Expenses again soared, when a massive Muslim army invaded the empire in 806, forcing Nikephoros I to pay a ransom of 50,000 gold coins and a yearly tribute of 30,000 gold coins. In order to impress the Caliph of Baghdad, Theophilos distributed 36,000 gold coins to the citizens of Baghdad, and in 838, he was forced to pay 100,000 gold dinars to the Caliph. The Byzantine economic recovery in the early 9th century can be seen by the fact that Emperor Theophilos was able to leave 7,000,000 nomismata/31.5 tonnes of gold in the imperial treasury for his successor in 842. After Theophilos' death his wife Theodora II continued his successful policies and even increased the imperial reserves to 7,848,000 nomismata.

Around 850, the land and head taxes yielded an estimated 2,900,000 nomismata annually for the empire. Commerce during this period increased dramatically, therefore contributing 400,000 nomismata annually. The expenditures of the period were large, but manageable by the treasury. Approximately 1,400,000 nomismata went to the payroll of the army annually while other military costs took another 800,000 nomismata annually. Supporting the Byzantine bureaucracy needed 500,000 nomismata. Also, imperial largess cost the treasury 100,000 nomismata every year. All of these expenses meant that the Byzantine government had about 500,000 nomismata in surplus revenue each year, much more than in the 8th century.

Unfortunately under their son Michael III the reserves dwindled to about 100,000 nomismata. However, under Basil I's prudent economic policies, the state quickly raised 4,300,000 nomismata, far more even than the empire's annual revenue of 3,300,000 nomismata. During the period of the Macedonian Emperors, internal trade within the Byzantine Empire grew, which increased the wealth of the Byzantine Empire. State revenues during this period grew rapidly, increasing from 3.1 million nomismata in 842 to 3.9 million nomismata in 959, to 5.9 million nomismata in 1025.

When Liutprand of Cremona was sent as an ambassador to the Byzantine capital in the 940s, he was overwhelmed by the imperial residence, the luxurious meals, and acrobatic entertainment.

Sviatoslav I was paid 15,000 pounds of gold by Nikephoros II to invade Bulgaria in 968. John Tzimiskes received the equivalent to 3,000,000 gold coins from the Muslims of the city of Ecbatana. By the time of Basil II's death in 1025, the annual income had increased to 5,900,000 - 7,000,000 nomismata, which allowed him to amass a large gold reserve of 14,400,000 nomismata (200,000 pounds/90 tonnes of gold) in the treasury for his successor. Even then, Basil II had waived two years' worth of land and hearth taxes, which would have been worth 8 million more nomismata. The wealth of the empire at Basil's death was so immense that it impressed the Muslims, such that a late eleventh-century Arab source informs us that “When Basil, son of Romanos, the emperor of Byzantium, died . . . he left ten thousand qintars of gold coins ( 1,000,000 pounds or 72,000,000 gold coins) and jewels worth 54 million dinars.” Constantine IX was also able to send the Caliph 30 quintars of gold (216,000 nomisma) and 300,000 gold dinars.

1081-1204: Komnenian, Angelid Dynasties

Nevertheless, the Byzantine economy went into a long decline until the Comnenian Dynasty was able to revive the economy. In the aftermath of the Battle of Manzikert, Alp Arslan at first suggested to Emperor Romanos IV a ransom of 10,000,000 gold coins, but later reduced it to 1,500,000 gold coins with a further 360,000 gold coins annually.

In exchange for an alliance, Alexios I sent 360,000 gold coins to Emperor Henry IV. The wealth of the empire under the Comnenians can be seen by how Emperor Manuel I was able to ransom some Latin prisoners from the Muslims for 100,000 dinars, then 150,000 dinars for Bohemond III in 1165, 120,000 dinars for Raynald of Châtillon, and 150,000 dinars for Baldwin of Ibelin in 1180. When Manuel became emperor he ordered 2 gold coins to be given to every householder in Constantinople and 200 pounds of gold (including 200 silver coins annually) to be given to the Eastern Orthodox Church. When his niece Theodora married King Baldwin III of Jerusalem in 1157, Manuel gave her a dowry of 100,000 gold coins, 10,000 gold coins for marriage expenses, and presents (jewels and silk garments) which were worth 14,000 gold coins total. The expense of Manuel's involvement in Italy must have cost the treasury a great deal (probably more than 2,160,000 hyperpyra or 30,000 pounds of gold). Then he also promised to pay 5,000 pounds of gold to the Pope and the Curia. During his reign, Manuel bought a very rich jewel (for 62,000 silver marks) which was used during the coronation of the Latin Emperor Baldwin I. The main source of the state's wealth in the 12th century was the kommerkion, a customs duty levied at Constantinople on all imports and exports, which was stated to have collected 20,000 hyperpyra each day. This, combined with other sources of income, meant the empire's annual revenue was at 5,600,000 hyperpyra in 1150. Under the Komnenian emperors, many exemptions of trade duties were given to the Italian traders, which meant the loss of about 50,000 hyperpyra annually. A Venetian embassy visited Constantinople in 1184 and an agreement was reached that compensation of 1,500 pounds of gold (or 108,000 hyperpyra) would be paid for the losses incurred in 1171. By the end of Manuel I's reign the amount of money used to maintain the Komnenian imperial family is said to be able to maintain an army of 100,000 men.

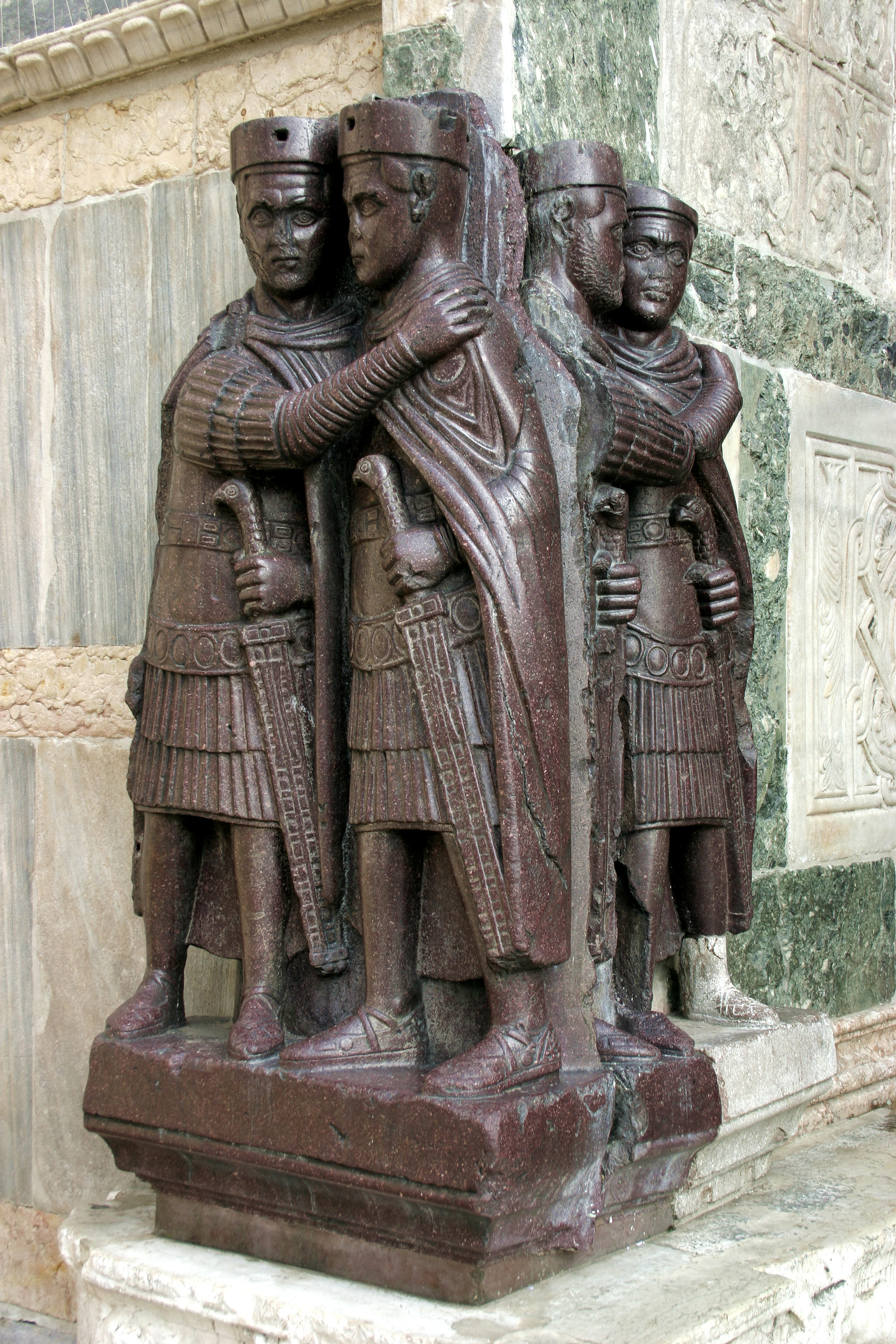
The porphyry statue of the Tetrarchs was plundered from Constantinople and placed on the façade of Saint Mark's Church, Venice.

After the demise of the Komnenoi, the Byzantine economy declined under the impact of several factors: the mismanagement under the Angeloi, the dismemberment of the Empire after 1204, the successive territorial losses to the Turks (although the strong economic interaction of Byzantine territories with those lost by the Empire continued), and the Italian expansion in the Mediterranean and the Black Sea. When Isaac II Angelos became Emperor in 1185, a mob broke into the palace and carried off 1,200 pounds of gold, 3,000 pounds of silver, and 20,000 pounds of bronze coins. In 1195, Holy Roman Emperor Henry VI forced Byzantine Emperor Alexios III Angelos to pay him a tribute of 1,000 pounds of gold (originally 5,000 pounds of gold) and in 1204 Alexios III took 1,000 pounds of gold (or 72,000 hyperpyra) when he fled Constantinople, leaving the treasury empty. Fires ravaged the northern and central sections of the city, resulting in a steady exodus of residents. The sack of Constantinople by Latin crusaders in 1204 was an economic catastrophe. However, even with the empire at its poorest in 1203, Alexios IV managed to pay 440,000 hyperpyra out of 200,000 silver marks (equivalent to 800,000 hyperpyra) to the Crusaders. The official tally of plunder from Constantinople was about 900,000 silver marks, the equivalent of about 3,600,000 hyperpyra or 50,000 pounds/22.5 tonnes of gold, although this figure likely does not include the value of the countless icons and books destroyed, ancient statues melted down (some made in Alexander the Great's time), and the destruction of other cultural artifacts. In 1237, Latin Emperor Baldwin II pawned the Crown of Thorns to a Venetian merchant for 13,134 gold coins.

1261-1453: Palaiologan Dynasty

By the time the Palaiologoi took power, Italian merchants had come to dominate the trade by sea whilst Turkic incursions prevented any success from trade across roads. Michael VIII Palaiologos strove to restore the capital, but lacked the resources to do so. In 1282, Michael VIII was forced to drain the treasury to pay the enormous bribe of 60,000 hyperpyra to King Peter III of Aragon to invade the Kingdom of Sicily. By 1303, the empire's annual revenue dropped to less than 1,800,000 hyperpyra, under Andronikos II Palaiologos. In 1321, only with extreme effort was Andonikos II able to raise revenues to 1,000,000 hyperpyra.

The Byzantine economy had declined so much that by 1343, Empress Anna of Savoy had to pawn the Byzantine crown jewels for 30,000 Venetian ducats, which was the equivalent of 60,000 hyperpyra. In 1348, Constantinople had an annual revenue of 30,000 hyperpyra while across the Golden Horn in the Genoese colony of Galata, the annual revenue was 200,000 hyperpyra. When Emperor John VI Kantakouzenos attempted to rebuild the Byzantine navy, he was only able to raise an inadequate 50,000 hyperpyra. The only success during this period was when the Republic of Genoa agreed to pay a war indemnity of 100,000 hyperpyra in 1349. When Emperor John V Palaiologos was captured by Ivan Alexander in 1366, he was forced to pay a ransom of 180,000 florins. In 1370, the empire owed Venice, 25,663 hyperpyra (of which only 4,500 hyperpyra had so far been paid) for damage done to Venetian property. In February 1424, Manuel II Palaiologos signed an unfavorable peace treaty with the Ottoman Turks, whereby the Byzantine Empire was forced to pay 300,000 silver coins to the Sultan on annual basis. In 1453, the economy of the Genoan quarter in Constantinople had a revenue almost 7 times greater than that of the whole Empire — not even a shadow of its former self. Emperor Constantine XI owed Venice 17,163 hyperpyra when he died in 1453.

The exact amount of annual income the Byzantine government received, is a matter of considerable debate, due to the scantness and ambiguous nature of the primary sources. The following table contains approximate estimates.

| Year | Annual Revenue |
|---|---|
| 305 | 9,400,000 solidi/42.3 tonnes of gold |
| 457 | 7,800,000 solidi |
| 518 | 8,500,000 solidi |
| 533 | 5,000,000 solidi |
| 540 | 11,300,000 solidi/50.85 tonnes of gold |
| 555 | 6,000,000 solidi |
| 565 | 8,500,000 solidi |
| 641 | 3,700,000 nomismata |
| 668 | 2,000,000 nomismata |
| 775 | 1,800,000 nomismata |
| 775 | 2,000,000 nomismata |
| 842 | 3,100,000 nomismata |
| 850 | 3,300,000 nomismata |
| 959 | 4,000,000 nomismata |
| 1025 | 5,900,000 nomismata |
| 1150 | 5,600,000 hyperpyra |
| 1303 | 1,800,000 hyperpyra |
| 1321 | 1,000,000 hyperpyra |

== Coinage ==
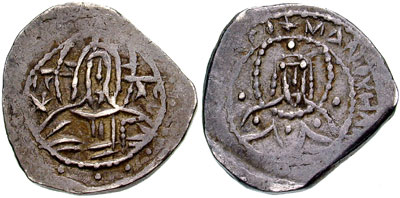
Half stavraton issued by Manuel II (3.53 g). The inscription reads "Manuel in Christ [our] God, faithful emperor."

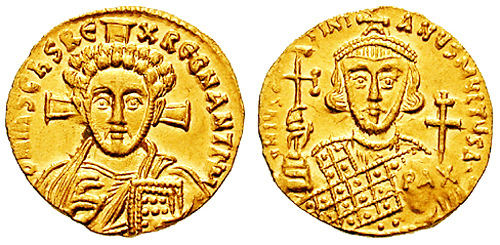
Gold solidus of Justinian II (4.42 g). Struck after 692.

Byzantine coinage formed the backbone of the empire’s economic system and had a stable monetary structure. Following the reforms of Emperor Anastasius I in 498 CE, the Byzantines developed a sophisticated system based on the gold solidus (or nomisma), which maintained remarkable consistency in weight and purity for over seven centuries. It circulated far beyond the empire’s borders, throughout Europe, the Middle East, and even into Asia, serving effectively as a reserve currency for much of the Middle Ages in areas like Europe and the Near East. Merchants and rulers alike used the solidus as a standard of value and a store of wealth, and its stability underpinned the empire’s extensive trade networks. Even after later debasements and the introduction of the hyperpyron in the 11th century, Byzantine gold coinage remained influential, symbolizing the fiscal strength and far-reaching economic presence of the Byzantine Empire. By the early 14th century, Byzantine coinage had shifted toward Western European influences. In 1304, the empire introduced the basilikon, a pure silver coin modelled after the Venetian ducat, signalling the decline of the older Komnenian monetary system. Later, in 1367, the stavraton became the principal coin, a heavy silver piece worth twice the fine metal content of the last hyperpyron. However, by the late 12th and early 13th centuries—especially after the Fourth Crusade in 1204—the fragmentation of Byzantine territory led to the creation of separate regional and feudal currencies, such as those of Trebizond, Bulgaria, and Serbia. Venetian coins also began circulating widely within the empire, replacing the once-dominant Byzantine currency. This marked a sharp contrast to earlier centuries, when Byzantine coinage had maintained a virtual monopoly within its borders and was widely used beyond them, reflecting the empire’s former political and economic authority.

During Byzantine history, supervision of the mints belonged to the Emperor; thus the government controlled, to a certain degree, the money supply. (Note: Under Anastasius I there were only four mints in the empire, but Justinian's reconquests resulted in a significant increase in their number. As a result of an administrative reorganization and of the loss of much of the empire's territories, their number was again greatly reduced during the 7th century. See List of Byzantine mints (Grierson, Byzantine Coinage, 5))

== Trade ==
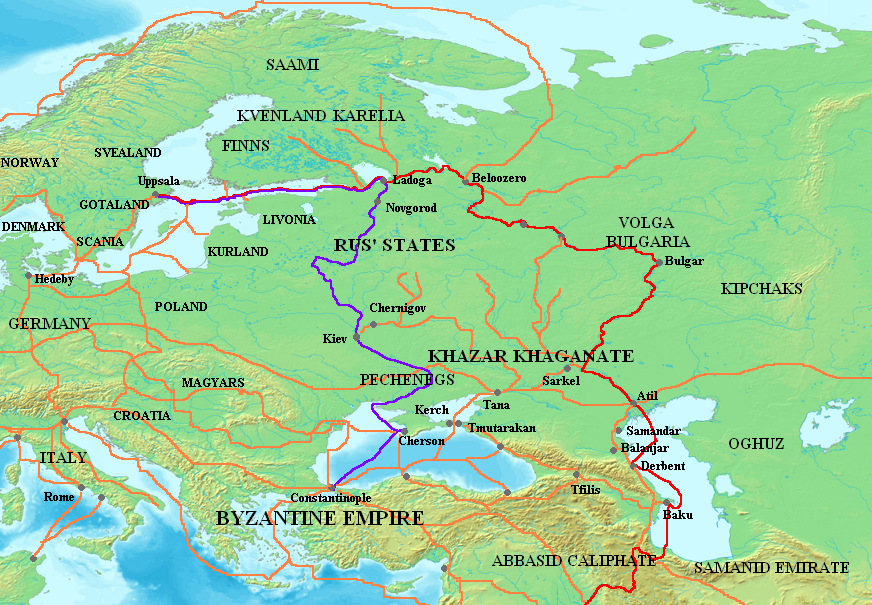
Map showing the major Varangian trade routes, and the Trade Route from the Varangians to the Greeks (in purple). Other trade routes of the 8th-11th centuries shown in orange.

One of the primary economic foundations of the empire was trade. Constantinople occupied a strategic position along major east–west and north–south trade routes. On the other hand, Trebizond functioned as an important port in eastern trade networks, although specific routes shifted over time in response to wars and changing political conditions. Byzantine authorities consistently levied a ten percent tax on both imports and exports. Luxury goods such as silk, spices, and incense were particularly valued within the Byzantine Empire.

Grain and silk were two of the most important trade commodities for the empire. As grain was primarily supplied from Byzantine North Africa and Egypt, the Arab invasions of Egypt and of Syria in the 7th century harmed Byzantium's trade and affected grain shipments.

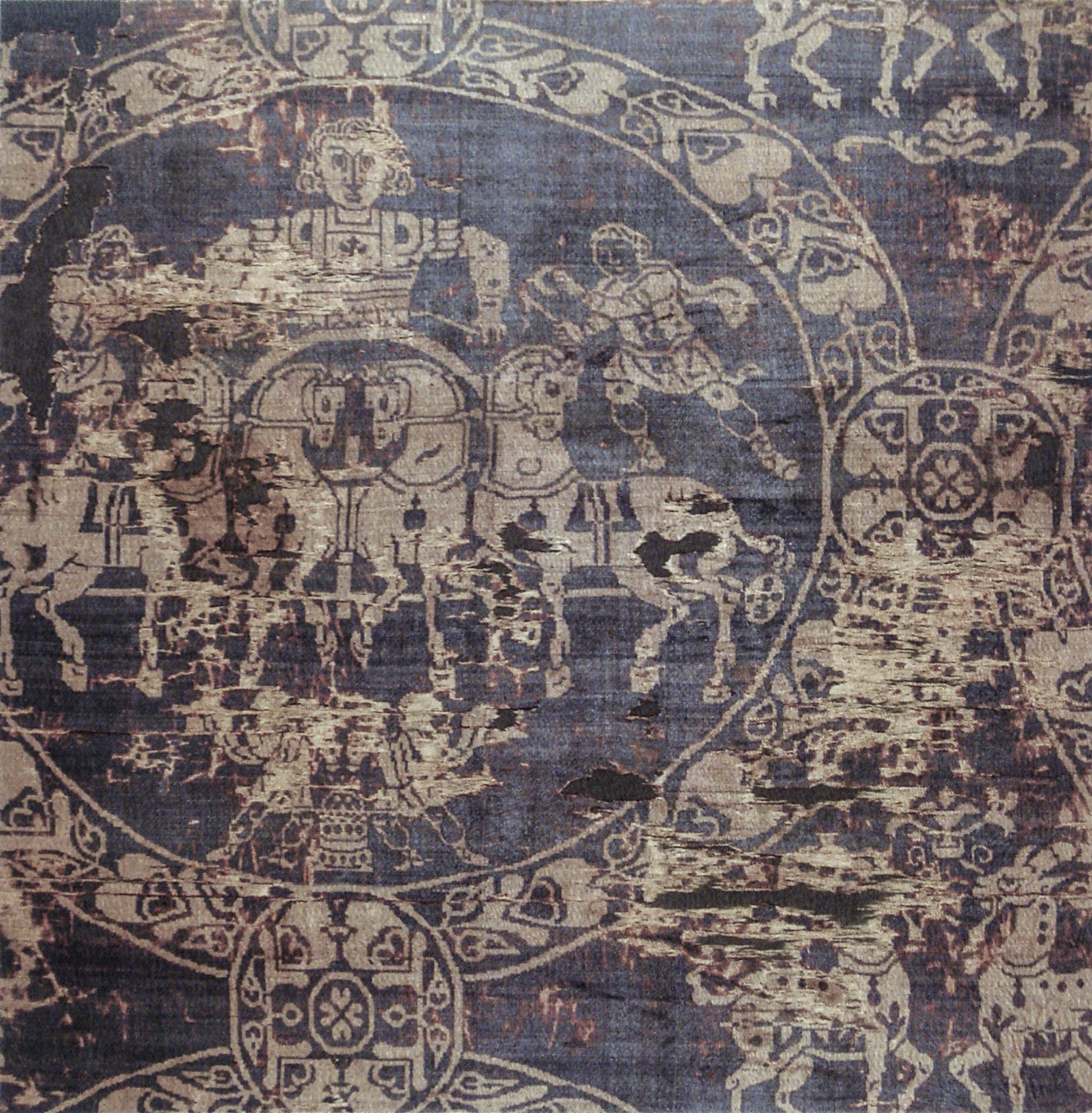
The Shroud of Charlemagne, a polychrome Byzantine silk, 9th century. Paris, Musée National du Moyen Âge.

The Byzantine state used silk both as a means of payment and in diplomacy. Raw silk was bought from China and made up into fine brocades and cloth-of-gold that commanded high prices through the world. In the mid-sixth century two monks smuggled silk worms out of China into the empire, and subsequently the overland silk-trade became less important. After Justinian I (r. 527–565) the manufacturing and sale of silk became an imperial monopoly, with processing limited to imperial factories, and product sold to authorized buyers.

Textiles were also exported to Egypt, and they also appear in Bulgaria and the West. The empire had also trading activity through Venice (as long as Venice formed part of the empire's Exarchate of Ravenna). In 992 the Emperor Basil II concluded a treaty with the Venetian Doge Pietro Orseolo II, reducing Venice's custom duties in Constantinople from 30 nomismata to 17 nomismata in return for the Venetians agreeing to transport Byzantine troops to Southern Italy in times of war. During the 11th and 12th centuries Italian traders in the empire operated under privileged conditions, incorporated in treaties and privileges that were granted to Amalfi, Venice, Genoa, and Pisa.

== Daily life ==
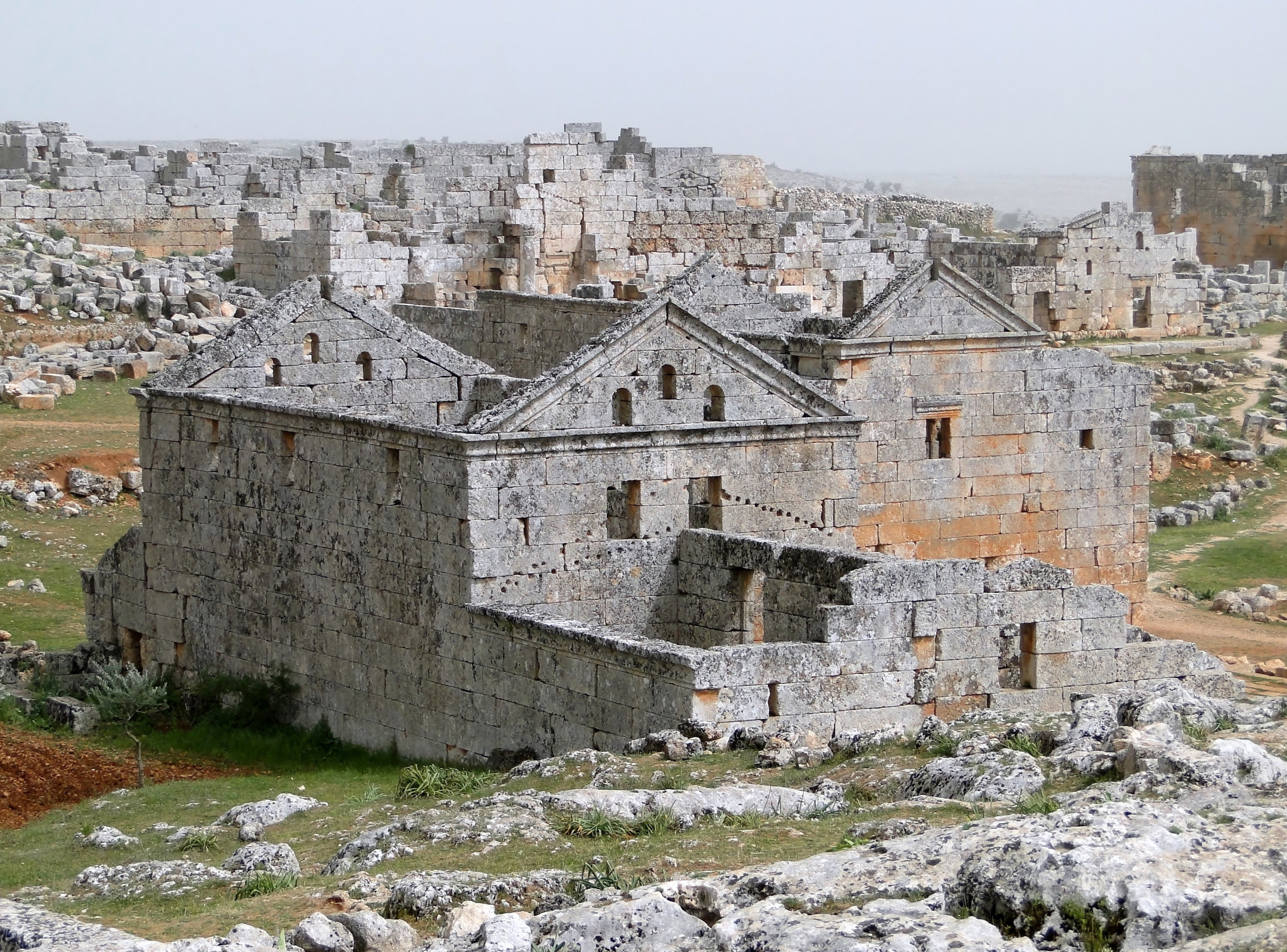
A building as part of the Dead Cities in Syria.These buildings suggest a high level of prosperity in Syrian villages during the period of Late Antiquity.

Cities in the Byzantine Empire contained market places, theatres, baths, colonnaded streets, churches, shops, cook shops and workshops as well as other facilities. Urban life was prosperous, and there was a vast range of occupations ranging from public and ecclesiastical officials to sausage sellers, barbers and dancers. Prominent among them are merchants and artisans. Manufactures included clothes, linen, leather, shoes, pottery, hardware, glass and purple dye. People worked gold, stone and marble and produced and sold many food products such as fruits, vegetables, cakes, pastries, bread, fish and drinks. Bankers, carpenters, architects, lawyers, tailors, cleaners, and keepers of shops, taverns and restaurants added to the complement of activities. As such, cities such as those in Asia Minor flourished. In most places, the heights of prosperity were reached in the late 5th and early 6th centuries, and the work of Justinian was especially evident in many. However, almost all succumbed to the economic changes and invasions of the 7th century. The average wage for an unskilled worker in the Byzantine Empire was about 1 nomisma per month or about 10-12 nomisma per year. Skilled workers and the wealthiest workers received considerably more, earning up to 10 and 150 times more respectively.

Agriculture was the main occupation of the empire, and villages and market towns contained the vast majority of the population. In the cases of Syria and Palestine, well preserved villages and towns reveal a high standard of living and an unexpected degree of wealth, even in remote areas. Nevertheless, rural life was poorer than urban, both materially and culturally. The countryside contained a dense network of prosperous villages, with wheatfields and vineyards, cattle, mules and oxen. Apart from farmers, there were smiths, lime burners and builders as well as teachers, sorcerers, fortune tellers and doctors. The Byzantines followed a diet characteristic of the medieval Mediterranean world, consisting of grains and legumes, olive oil and wine, dairy goods, fish and various meats, along with fresh produce. Honey served as the main source of sweetness, and poultry supplied both eggs and meat. In regions too cold for olive cultivation, butter took the place of olive oil as the primary fat.

Most Byzantines lived in houses that were made of stone (for the foundations and lower walls), timber, mud brick and thatch, with some areas utilising roof tiles and bricks. A regular house suitable for a single family generally had three or four rooms facing a small yard enclosed by a wall. Livestock were stored in the enclosure, which included a few fruit trees, a grapevine and a garden. A small hearth or oven was located in a corner, and the latrine/cesspit was located in another corner. An ox or a donkey was penned in a stable or the yard. One or two rooms were allocated for the storage of food and household goods. Living and sleeping quarters were separated, and cisterns/wells provided access to water. The plumbing that the average Byzantine had was generally limited to drains. Grain, preserved foods and oil were stored in another room, with flour being stored in large earthenware jars. Sealed amphorae were used both for storing items and for carrying goods to the market. Bags and baskets held other goods. Stone mortars, pestles and pottery were utilised for food preparation, with wealthier families using metal equipment. Pots, baking dishes, pitchers, jars, cups and dishes were made of clay, and wooden bowls and spoons completed the table setting. Regarding the interior of houses, windows were generally small, and heavy curtains and wood shutters were fitted to regulate the temperature in winter and summer seasons. Floors were covered with mats, and houses of better quality had stone slabs/tiles. Important spaces were decorated by colorful rugs. People sat on benches or on the floor, and a small wooden table was used for dining. Most families kept at least one room for receiving guests. Religious objects generally decorated one corner, which included candles, terra-cotta lamps, icons, bronze amulets and jewellery. A bed was generally a wood-frame structure supporting a straw mattress, although in some cases benches that were built against a wall were used as a sleeping platform. A cabinet/chest was used to store money and other valuables. Lastly, cooking was conducted on a portable iron brazier or in a brick oven.

== Industries ==
Mining

The Byzantine Empire inherited the advanced and varied mining practices of Rome, which included extensive mining regions producing gold, silver, copper, iron, and other metals, alongside numerous smaller and even modest-scale operations. Large, state-run mining enterprises functioned alongside privately or collectively leased mines, as well as small-scale mining carried out by peasants as a supplementary source of income. An intricate administrative system oversaw these activities, managing imperial mining operations, imposing specific taxes on land rich in mineral resources, and collecting production dues from miners and others. This bureaucracy ensured that all precious metal output ultimately came under state control. Gold extraction took place in places such as the Balkan territories and along the frontiers of Armenia. Recent archaeological discoveries have also identified evidence of middle Byzantine mining activity in several locations of northwestern Asia Minor—specifically in the area between the Hellespont and the Gulf of Adramyttion, near Kinyra on the island of Thasos, and around Peristera. Iron mining operations were likewise conducted in the Taurus Mountains.

Glassmaking

During the early Byzantine era, the widespread adoption of glass-blowing revolutionized the glass industry, leading to rapid growth in production and craftsmanship. Glass became an essential material in various aspects of daily and religious life, used not only for windows in churches, where it transformed interior lighting, but also for lamps, tableware, and decorative objects. The artistry of glass even influenced the development of certain ceramic styles that sought to imitate its beauty. Archaeological evidence points to several major centers of glass manufacture and distribution, including Egypt, Palestine, Transjordan, Sardis, Constantinople, and others. Production flourished across both the eastern Mediterranean and parts of Europe, suggesting a vibrant exchange of techniques and styles between these regions, although the exact nature of their economic and technological connections remains uncertain.

Textiles

The textile industry was a cornerstone of the Byzantine economy and one of the most vital commercial sectors inherited from antiquity. Production took place in both state controlled and privately owned workshops spread across the empire. Among the most renowned imperial manufacturing centers were the linen factories of Scythopolis, the wool-processing mills of Heraclea in Thrace, Kyzikos, and Caesarea, amongst others. The Byzantines primarily worked with wool and linen, though hemp also played a significant role in fabric production. Textiles served a wide range of purposes, from garments and household furnishings to wall hangings and carpets, and their creation required great technical skill. Processes such as spinning, weaving, carding, and dyeing required artisans who possessed specialized expertise and training. These crafts not only met domestic needs but also supported long-distance trade, as fine Byzantine textiles were highly prized throughout the Mediterranean and beyond.

Metalworking

Metalworking was the most important manufacturing sector in the Byzantine Empire, split into work with base metals and precious metals. Artisans used iron, copper, lead, and tin to make everyday items like nails, tools, utensils, keys, clamps, and weapons in both imperial workshops (Sardis, Concordia...etc) and private workshops, sometimes adding leather or precious metals. Weapons and military clothing were highly admired and influenced neighboring peoples. Gold and silver work required wealthy guilds, as the materials were valuable. Church treasuries and imperial courts showed the empire’s wealth, with luxury items combining gold, gems, pearls, and enamel. The state controlled silver through hallmarks and closely regulated gold, which was the main monetary standard. Goldsmiths often handled money-changing and banking, gaining influence over public funds and taxes, especially under Justinian's reign.

Other crafts

Archaeological and textual evidence points to the prominence of woodworking and related crafts in the Byzantine world. These activities encompassed a broad spectrum of skills, including carpentry, shipbuilding and others, all of which were essential to both everyday life and large-scale economic production. Likewise, trades connected to the treatment and use of animal hides were well developed. These included leatherworking, shoemaking, the manufacture of garments, and others. In addition, artisans were well acquainted with working with bone, ivory, and wax, crafting both practical items and detailed decorative objects.

== Finance ==
Money changers held an important role in the urban economy and were prominent in the popular imagination of city life. Numerous texts and images depict them at their tables, equipped with coin scales and accounting registers, performing money-changing and assaying, verifying the weight and fineness of coins used in transactions. Once authenticated, coins were placed in sealed sacks by the money changers.

They operated shops or iron tables in commercial areas, performing relatively straightforward roles, but they were vital in daily life due to the wide value differences between gold, silver, and copper coins, facilitating small change for purchases and gifts. Because their work involved coinage and money circulation, money changers, while engaged in private business, also held a semi-public role, subject to stricter state oversight and required to respond to summonses regarding minting or the collection of older coins for replacement. There were also loans and partnerships in Byzantium that encouraged investment and other projects, which helps to drive economic growth.

== Gross Domestic Product (GDP) ==
The Byzantine GDP per capita has been estimated by the World Bank economist Branko Milanovic to range from $680 to $770 in 1990 International Dollars at its peak around 1000 (reign of Basil II). This corresponds to a range of $1674 to $1897 in today's dollars. The Byzantine population size at the time is estimated to have been between 12 and 18 million. This would yield a total GDP somewhere between $20 and $34 billion in today's terms.

== See also ==
- Economy of ancient Greece
- Economy of Kievan Rus'
- Roman economy
- Byzantine silk
- Byzantine glass
- Byzantine agriculture
