= Byzantine glass =

Glassmaking in the Byzantine Empire

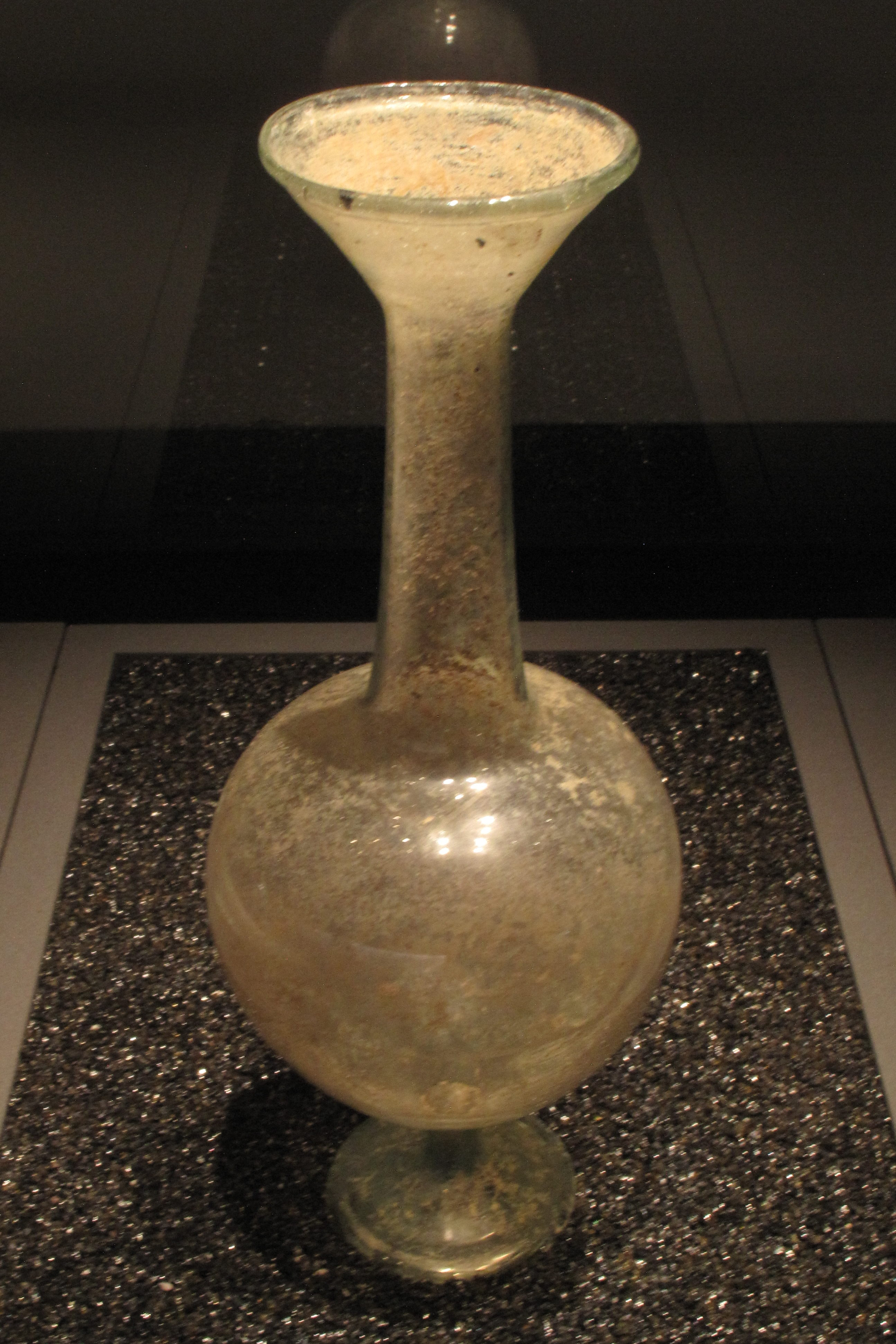
6th-century bottle from Syria, on display at the Landesmuseum Württemberg.

Byzantine glass objects resembled their earlier Hellenistic counterparts, during the fourth and early fifth centuries CE in both form and function. Over the course of the fifth century CE, Byzantine glass blowers, based mostly in the area of Syria and Palestine, developed a distinct Byzantine style. While glass vessels continued to serve as the primary vehicles for pouring and drinking liquid, glassware for lighting, currency and commodity weights, window panes, and glass tesserae for mosaics and enamels also surged in popularity.

Following the Arab conquests of the seventh century CE, large quantities of glass were imported from the Levant, which continued to produce raw and manufactured glass. Scholars once believed that glassware was an expensive luxury good reserved for the upper strata of society, however, recent archaeological excavations have unearthed a considerable quantity of unadorned glassware intended for lower-class residents.

== Production ==
Chemical analyses of Byzantine glassware have demonstrated that Byzantine glass was composed of the same basic materials as Roman glass—combining sand-derived silica, a fluxing agent, and lime, as well as various coloring agents.

Roman and Byzantine glass-making was divided into two phases. The first, called "primary glass-making" involved the conversion of sand and stabilizer into raw glass. Separate workshops would then re-heat the glass and shape it into an object, in a phase referred to as "secondary glass-making". Although there is considerable archaeological evidence establishing primary glass-making sites, secondary glass-making sites remain difficult to pinpoint.

The largest number of glass production sites from the Early Byzantine period have been unearthed in Syria and Palestine, as well as Egypt. Glass factories have also been discovered in Greece (Corinth, Thessoloniki) and Asia Minor. A chemical analysis of sixth-century Byzantine glass weights demonstrated that glass was also manufactured in Carthage and along the Danube River. Literary sources refer to glass-making sites in Constantinople, Emesa (Homs, Syria), and various Egyptian towns.

== Labor ==
Though some towns were home to glass-maker guilds, most Byzantine glass-makers were independent entrepreneurs. Glass-workers could be either male or female. An extant glass-making contract from Armenia mentions a woman glass manufacturer.

== Glass-making styles and techniques by object ==
Glass vessel shapes in the Byzantine period did not deviate greatly from those of the high Roman period. Beginning in the late fifth century, glassblowers in the near east produced increasingly larger vessels. They also introduced the folded, stemmed foot. In the sixth and seventh centuries Byzantine glass vessels typically features a delicate u-shaped mouth. A number of "classical" Roman glassware shapes were phased out by the fifth century including: bowls, flat- bottomed cups and beakers, and footed wine jugs featuring trefoil mouths.

A major innovation of the Byzantine period was the invention of the glass lamp. Glass lamps are first attested in the first half of the fourth century CE in Palestine, where they began to replace the clay lamps in use at the time as they were much more efficient. By the middle of the fifth century their use was rapidly spreading westward. Initially these lamps were shaped just like drinking vessels, though the number of shapes expanded to seventeen over the course of the sixth and seventh centuries.

Following the "Triumph of Orthodoxy" in 843 CE, enamel relief icons became the predominant form of iconography in Byzantium. The best-known example is the Michael the Archangel enamel from the treasury of St. Mark's Basilica in Venice.

== Silver staining ==
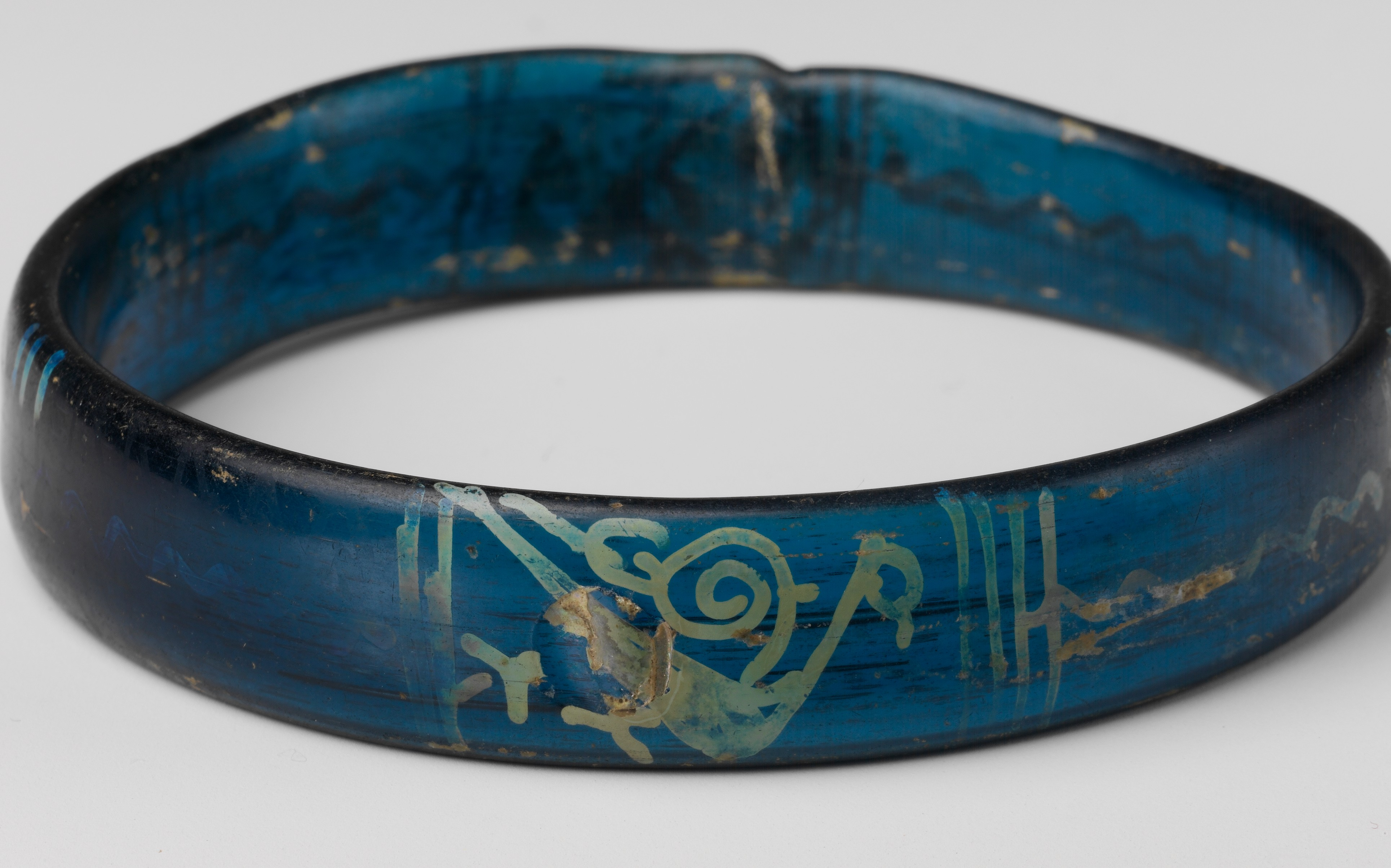
Byzantine glass silver-stained bracelet, dated 1100–1400, on display at the Metropolitan Museum of Art. Similar bracelets have been found throughout the Byzantine empire.

In the middle Byzantine period, Byzantine glass-makers adopted silver-staining techniques from the Arab world. Silver-stained glass is created by applying a metallic compound, mixed with a "carrier" of clay or ochre to the surface of the glass object, then the glass is fired below the softening point of the glass. This process results in the breakdown of the smeared compound and its transition into the body of the glass object, creating a "stained" effect. Depending on the makeup of the compound and the "carrier" this process can lead to a wide array of colors. While the Arabs began creating silver-stained glass objects in the late eighth century in Egypt, the first Byzantine silver-stained object has been dated to the ninth century. The most common items featuring Byzantine silver-stain are simple glass bracelets, dating from the tenth to thirteenth centuries, and being discovered across the Byzantine world, from Greece to Anatolia. The most famous example of Byzantine silver-staining is the interior inscription of the beautiful San Marco bowl, dated to the "Macedonian Renaissance" of the tenth century. Several fragments of silver-stained window glass have been discovered. Although silver staining was practiced by the Byzantines, silver-stained works were not as ubiquitous in Byzantium as they were to become in late Medieval Europe. However, the widespread use of silver-staining in Byzantium could in part explain the transmission of silver-stain technique from the Arab world to Western Europe.

== Sources ==
- Antonaras, Anastassios, "The Production and Uses of Glass in Byzantine Thessaloniki," in New Light on Old Glass, ed. by Christopher Entwistle and Liz James, (London: The British Museum, 2013), 189-198.
- Francois, Veronique, Spieser, Jean-Michael, "Pottery and Glass in Byzantium," in The Economic History of Byzantium, ed. by Angeliki E. Laiou, (Dumberton Oaks, 2002), 593-610.
- Jenkins, Marylin, "Islamic Glass: A Brief History," The Metropolitan Museum of Art Bulletin, New Series Vol.44 No.2 (Autumn 1986), 1-56.
- Laiou, Angeliki E., The Economic History of Byzantium, (Dumberton Oaks, 2002).
- Lightfoot, Christopher, "Glass Finds at Amorium," Dumbarton Oaks Papers, Vol.59 (2005), 173-181.
- Pentcheva, Bissera V. "The Performative Icon, " The Art Bulletin, vol.88 no.4 (Dec.2006), 631- 655.
- Pilosi, Lisa, Whitehouse, David, "Early Islamic and Byzantine Silver Stain," in New Light on Old Glass, ed. by Christopher Entwistle and Liz James, (London: The British Museum, 2013), 329-337.
- Schibille, Nadine, Meek, Andrew, Benguez, Tobias, Entwistle, Chris, Avisseau-Broustet Mathilde, Da Mota, Henrique, Gratuze, Bernard, "Comprehensive Chemical Characterization of Byzantine Glass Weights," PLoS One Vol.11, no.12 (Dec.2016). e0168289.
- Stern, E. Marianne, Roman Byzantine, and Early Medieval Glass 10 BCE-700 CE : Ernesto Wolf Collection, (Ostfildern-Ruit: Haje Cantz, 2001).
- Stern, E. Marianne, "Glass Producers in Late Antique and Byzantine Papyri," in New Light on Old Glass, ed. by Christopher Entwistle and Liz James, (London: The British Museum, 2013), 82-88.
