= Edward J. Watts =

American classical historian and writer

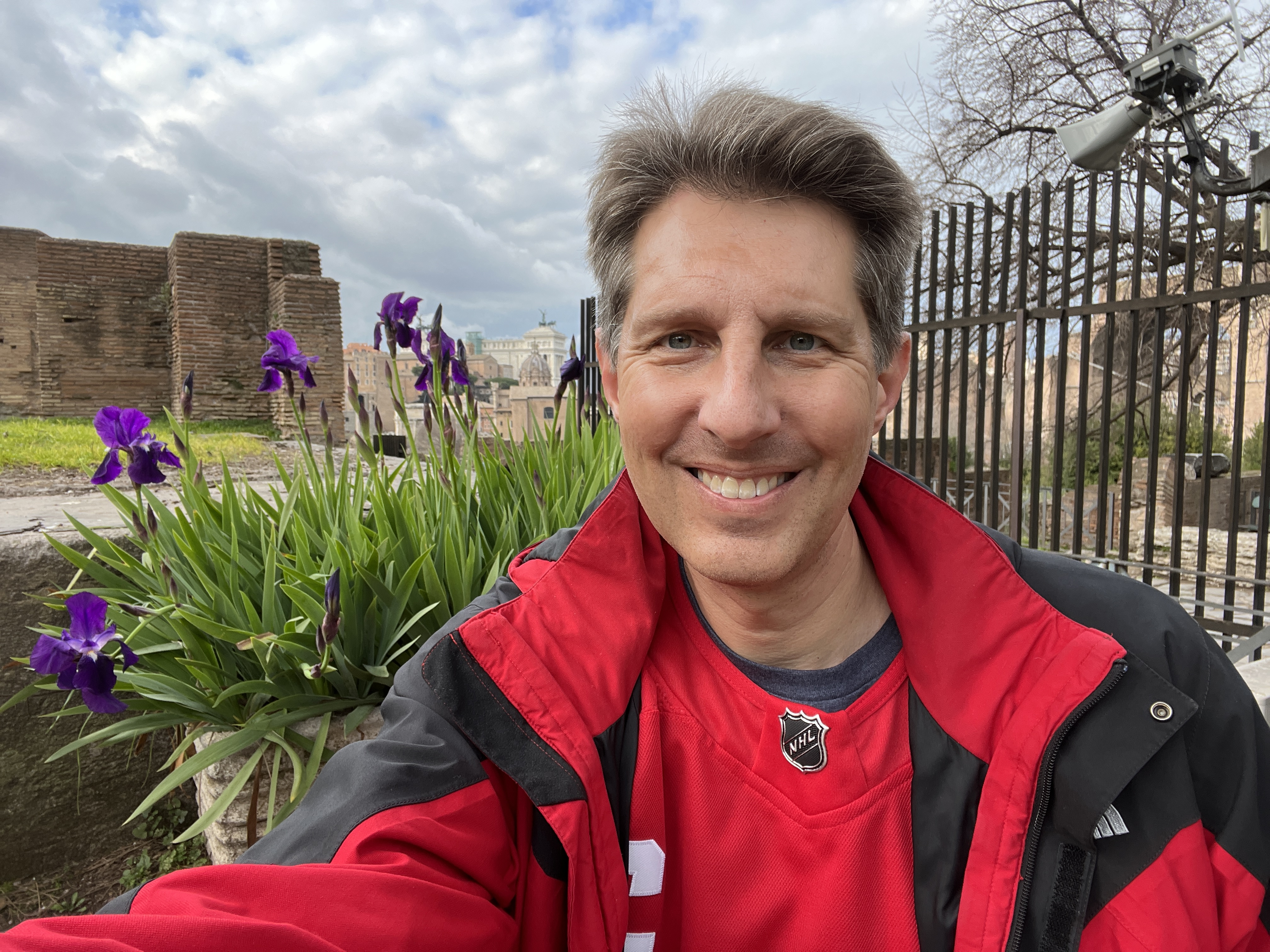
- Watts in Rome, 2023
- Born: Edward Jay Watts; 1 March 1975 (age 51)
- Occupations: Author, professor
- Board member of: San Diego Center for Hellenic Studies

Academic background
- Education: South Brunswick High School (NJ) 1993
- Alma mater: Brown University (BA); Yale University (PhD)
- Thesis: City and School in Late Antique Athens and Alexandria

Academic work
- Discipline: Classical Studies
- Sub-discipline: Intellectual, political, and religious history of the Roman Empire and the early Byzantine Empire
- Institutions: University of California, San Diego

Edward Jay Watts (born 1 March 1975) is an American classical historian and writer. Since 2012, he has been a professor of history at University of California, San Diego.

== Education and career ==
Watts received a bachelor of arts in classics, and ancient and medieval culture at Brown University, and his PhD in history from Yale University in 2002.

Watts co-directed the San Diego Center for Hellenic Studies from 2014–2016 and again from 2022–2026. He currently holds the Alkiviadis Vassiliadis Endowed Chair for Byzantine Greek History at Hellenic Centre.

== Public impact ==
His early work, which focused on the cultural and religious changes affecting philosophy and educational life as the Roman Empire embraced Christianity, included City and School in Late Antique Athens and Alexandria, which won the CAMWS Outstanding Publication award.

His later works have described social and political change in the Roman world in a fashion that prompted popular reflections about twenty-first century society. The Final Pagan Generation, which offers a generational history of the men born in the 310s that traces the experience of living through the Christianisation of the Roman Empire, sparked a series of conversations among conservative thinkers and other intellectuals about similar, dramatic shifts quietly taking place in twenty-first century life.

His books focused on political change in the Roman and Byzantine worlds, The Eternal Decline and Fall of Rome and Mortal Republic: How Rome Fell into Tyranny prompted economists as well as cultural and political commentators in the United States and around the world, to consider the relevance of the legacies of the Roman world to modern representative democracies and culture. He is also the creator of the YouTube channel Rome's Eternal Decline.

== Books ==
- City and School in Late Antique Athens and Alexandria. University of California Press, 2008.
- Riot in Alexandria: Tradition and Group Dynamics in Late Antique Pagan and Christian Communities. University of California Press, 2010.
- The Final Pagan Generation: Rome's Unexpected Path to Christianity. University of California Press, 2015.
- Hypatia: The Life and Legend of an Ancient Philosopher. Oxford University Press, 2017.
- Mortal Republic: How Rome Fell Into Tyranny. Basic Books, 2018.
- The Eternal Decline and Fall of Rome: The History of a Dangerous Idea. Oxford University Press, 2021.
- The Romans: A 2,000-Year History. Basic Books, 2025.
